

J 

J'accuse (1919)
J'accuse! (1938)
J.A.C.E. (2011)
J'ai faim !!! (2001)
J'ai perdu Albert (2018)
J'ai peur d'oublier (2011 TV)
J'ai Rencontré Le Père Noël (1984)
J'ai rêvé sous l'eau (2008)
J'ai tant aimé... (2008)
J'attendrai le suivant (2002)
J.C. (1972)
JCVD (2008)
J. D.'s Revenge (1976)
J. Edgar (2011)
J. Edgar Hoover (1987)
J'entends plus la guitare (1991)
JFK (1991)
JFK: 3 Shots That Changed America (2009)
JFK: The Lost Bullet (2013)
JK Enum Nanbanin Vaazhkai (2015)
JLA Adventures: Trapped in Time (2014)
J-Men Forever (1979)
JT Leroy (2018)
J-U-N-K (1920)

Ja 

Ja saapuu oikea yö (2012)
Ja sam iz Krajine, zemlje kestena (2013)

Jaa 

Jaadayum Mudiyum (2015)
Jaadu (1995)
Jaadugar: (1989 & 2022)
Jaag Utha Insan (1984)
Jaago: (1985, 2004 & 2010)
Jaagruti (1992)
Jaaji Mallige (2009)
Jaal: (1952, 1967, 1973 & 1986)
Jaal: The Trap (2003)
Jaalakam (1987)
Jaali Note (1960)
Jaan (1996)
Jaanam Samjha Karo (1999)
Jaan-e-Bahaar (1979)
Jaan-E-Mann: Let's Fall in Love... Again (2006)
Jaan Hatheli Pe (1987)
Jaan Hazir Hai (1975)
Jaan Ki Baazi (1985)
Jaan Ki Kasam (1991)
Jaan Kurbaan (2011)
Jaan Pechaan (1991)
Jaan Se Pyaara (1992)
Jaan Tere Naam (1992)
Jaana (1994)
Jaana Pehchana (2011)
Jaanam (1992)
Jaanam Samjha Karo (1999)
Jaanara Jaana (1967)
Jaanbaaz (2019)
Jaandaar (1979)
Jaane-Anjaane (1971)
Jaane Bhi Do Yaaro (1983)
Jaane Bhi Do Yaaron (2007)
Jaane Hoga Kya (2006)
Jaane Jaan (1983)
Jaane Jigar (1998)
Jaane Kahan Se Aayi Hai (2010)
Jaane Tu... Ya Jaane Na (2008)
Jaaneman: (1976 & 2012)
Jaani (2016)
Jaani Dost (1983)
Jaani Dushman (1979)
Jaani Dushman: Ek Anokhi Kahani (2002)
Jaani Dyakha Hawbe (2011)
Jaanisaar (2015)
Jaanoo (1985)
Jaanu: (2012 & 2020)
Jaanwar: (1983 & 1999)
Jaathakam (1989)
Jaathi Malli (1993)
Jaathi Pookkal (1987)
Jaathre (2015)
Jaatishwar (2014)

Jab 

Jab Harry Met Sejal (2017)
Jab Jab Phool Khile: (1965 & 1975)
Jab Pyaar Kisise Hota Hai (1998)
Jab Pyar Kisi Se Hota Hai (1961)
Jab Tak Hai Jaan (2012)
Jab We Met (2007)
Jab Yaad Kisi Ki Aati Hai (1967)
Jaba Jaba Maya Bascha (2011)
Jaban (1972)
Jabardasth (2013)
Jabariya Jodi (2019)
Jabberwocky: (1971 & 1977)
Jabe Babe – A Heightened Life (2005)
Jabilamma Pelli (1996)

Jac 

Jacaré (1942)
Jack: (1996, 2004, 2013 TV, 2014 & 2015)
Jack of All Trades: (1936 & 2012)
Jack Attack (2013)
Jack Be Nimble (1993)
Jack and the Beanstalk: (1902, 1917, 1931, 1952, 1967, 1974 & 2009)
Jack Brooks: Monster Slayer (2008)
The Jack Bull (1999 TV)
Jack of Diamonds (1967)
The Jack of Diamonds (1949)
Jack & Diane (2012)
Jack the Dog (2001)
Jack Em Popoy: The Puliscredibles (2018)
Jack Frost: (1934, 1964, 1979 TV, 1997 & 1998)
Jack Frost 2: Revenge of the Mutant Killer Snowman (2000)
Jack Frusciante Left the Band (1996)
Jack the Giant Killer: (1962 & 2013)
Jack the Giant Slayer (2013)
Jack Goes Boating (2010)
Jack Goes Home (2016)
The Jack of Hearts (1919)
Jack and Jenny (1963)
Jack and Jill: (1917, 1998 & 2011)
Jack and Jill vs. the World (2008)
Jack and Jill: A Postscript (1970)
Jack Johnson (1970)
Jack, Jules, Esther and Me (2013)
Jack to a King – The Swansea Story (2014)
Jack Lemmon – A Twist of Lemmon (1976)
Jack London (1943)
Jack McCall, Desperado (1953)
Jack O'Lantern (2004)
Jack Reacher (2012)
Jack Reacher: Never Go Back (2016)
Jack of the Red Hearts (2016)
Jack Reed: Badge of Honor (1993)
Jack Rio (2008)
Jack the Ripper: (1959 & 1976)
Jack Ryan: Shadow Recruit (2014)
Jack Says (2008)
Jack Slade (1953)
Jack of Spades (1960)
Jack Straw (1920)
Jack Strong (2014)
Jack Tar (1915)
Jack's Back (1988)
Jack's the Boy (1932)
Jack-Jack Attack (2005)
The Jack-Knife Man (1920)
Jack-O (1995)
Jack-Wabbit and the Beanstalk (1943)
The Jackal: (1997 & 2010)
Jackal of Nahueltoro (1969)
Jackals (2017)
The Jackals: (1917 & 1968)
The Jackals of a Great City (1916)
Jackass series:
Jackass: The Movie (2002)
Jackass Number Two (2006)
Jackass Presents: Mat Hoffman's Tribute to Evel Knievel (2008)
Jackass 3D (2010)
Jackass Presents: Bad Grandpa (2013)
Jackass Forever (2022)
Jackboot Mutiny (1955)
Jackboots on Whitehall (2010)
The Jackeroo of Coolabong (1920)
The Jacket (2005)
The Jackhammer Massacre (2004)
Jackie: (1921, 2010, 2012 & 2016)
Jackie Brown (1997)
Jackie and Bruce to the Rescue (1982)
Jackie Chan: My Stunts (1999)
Jackie Chan's First Strike (1997)
The Jackie Robinson Story (1950)
Jackie & Ryan (2014)
Jackie's Back (1999)
Jacknife (1989)
Jackpot: (1960, unfinished film, 1993, 2001, 2006, 2009, 2013, 2015, & 2018)
The Jackpot (1950)
Jackrabbit (2015)
Jackson: (2008 & 2015)
Jackson: My Life... Your Fault (1995)
Jacktown (1962)
Jacky (2000)
Jacky in Women's Kingdom (2014)
Jaco (2014)
Jacob (1994)
Jacob and Esau (1963)
Jacob the Liar (1975)
Jacob Two-Two Meets the Hooded Fang: (1978 & 1999)
Jacob's Ladder: (1990 & 2019)
Jacob's Sound (2003)
Jacobo Timerman: Prisoner Without a Name, Cell Without a Number (1983 TV)
Jacqueline (1956)
Jacques Brel Is Alive and Well and Living in Paris (1975)
Jacques and Jacotte (1936)
Jacques and November (1984)
Jacquou le Croquant (2007)

Jad–Jaf 

Jada: (2008 & 2019)
Jade (1995)
Jade Dynasty (2019)
The Jade Faced Assassin (1971)
Jade Goddess of Mercy (2003)
Jade Love (1984)
The Jade Mask (1945)
The Jade and the Pearl (2010)
Jade Warrior (2006)
Jaded (1998)
Jadesoturi (2006)
Jadhikkoru Needi (1981)
Jadi Jantem (1974)
Jadoo: (1951 & 2013)
Jadoogadu (2015)
Jadu Ka Shankh (1974)
Jadu Nagri (1940)
Jadu Tona (1977)
Jadugar (1946)
Jadui Bandhan (1941)
Jadui Kismat (1944)
Jadui Putli (1946)
Jadup and Boel (1980)
Jadur Banshi (1977)
Jadur Bashi (1977)
Jael and Sisera (1911)
Jaffa: (2009 & 2013)

Jag–Jah 

Jag Biti (1946)
Jag Jeondeyan De Mele (2009)
Jag Mandir (1991)
Jaga Hatare Pagha (2015)
Jaga Mecchida Maga (1972)
Jaga Mechida Huduga (1993)
Jagadam (2007)
Jagadeka Veera (1991)
Jagadeka Veerudu Athiloka Sundari (1990)
Jagadeka Veeruni Katha (1961)
Jagadguru Aadisankaran (1977)
Jagadguru Adi Shankara (2013)
Jagajyothi Basveshwara (1959)
Jaganmohini: (1951, 1978 & 2009)
Jagannatakam (1991)
Jagapati (2005)
Jagat (2015)
Jagat Mohini (1940)
Jagathalapratapan: (1944 & 1990)
Jagathy Jagadeesh in Town (2002)
Jagga (1964)
Jagga Jasoos (2017)
Jagga Tay Shera (1984)
Jagged Edge (1985)
Jaggu (1975)
Jaggu Dada (2016)
Jaggubhai (2010)
Jagir (1984)
Jagirdar (1937)
Jagratha (1989)
Jagriti (1954)
Jagte Raho (1956)
Jaguar: (1956, 1967, 1979, 1994 & 2016)
Le Jaguar (1996)
Jaguar Lives! (1979)
The Jaguar's Claws (1917)
Jahan Ara (1964)
Jahan Jaaeyega Hamen Paaeyega (2007)
Jahan Pyar Mile (1969)
Jahan Teri Yeh Nazar Hai (1981)
Jahan Tum Le Chalo (1999)
Jahan Tum Wahan Hum (1968)

Jai 

Jai: (2004 Tamil & 2004 Telugu)
Jai Bangladesh (1971)
Jai Bhim Comrade (2011)
Jai Bhole (2018)
Jai Bolo Telangana (2011)
Jai Chiranjeeva (2005)
Jai Devaa (unreleased)
Jai Gangaajal (2016)
Jai Hind (1994)
Jai Ho (2014)
Jai Ho Democracy (2015)
Jai Jagannatha (2007)
Jai Jawaan Jai Kisaan (2016)
Jai Jawan (1970)
Jai Jawan Jai Makan (1971)
Jai Jwala (1972)
Jai Kaali (1992)
Jai Karnataka (1989)
Jai Karoli Maa (1988)
Jai Lalitha (2014)
Jai Lava Kusa (2017)
Jai Maharashtra Dhaba Bhatinda (2013)
Jai Maruthi 800 (2016)
Ja Mata Di (1977)
Jai Mummy Di (2019)
Jai Radhe Krishna (1974)
Jai Santoshi Maa (1975)
Jai Simha (2018)
Jai Sriram (2013)
Jai Swadesh (1940)
Jai Veeru (2009)
Jai Vikraanta (1995)
Jaider, der einsame Jäger (1971)
Jaihind (2012)
Jaihind 2 (2014)
Jail: (2009 & 2021)
Jail Bait: (1937, 1954 & 2004)
Jail Birds (1914)
Jail Birds of Paradise (1934)
Jail Breakers (2002)
Jail Busters (1955)
Jail House Blues (1942)
Jail Yatra: (1947 & 1981)
Jailbait (2004)
The Jailbird (1920)
Jailbirds: (1940, 1991 & 2015)
Jailbreak: (1936 & 2017)
Jailbreak in Hamburg (1971)
Jailbreakers (1994)
The Jailbreakers (1960)
The Jailhouse (2010)
Jailhouse Rock (1957)
Jailor: (1938 & 1958)
Jailor Gaari Abbayi (1994)
Jailppulli (1957)
Jaime: (1974 & 1999)
Jaisi Karni Waisi Bharnii (1989)
Jait Re Jait (1977)
Jaitra Yatra (1991)

Jaj–Jak 

Jajabara (1975)
Jajantaram Mamantaram (2003)
Jajo's Secret (2009 TV)
Jak básníci neztrácejí naději (2004)
Jak dostat tatínka do polepšovny (1978)
Jak se Franta naučil bát (1959)
Jak se zbavit Helenky (1967)
Jaka Sembung (1981)
Jakarta Twilight (2011)
Jakarta Undercover (2007)
Jake Spanner, Private Eye (1989 TV)
Jake Speed (1986)
Jake Squared (2013)
Jake's Corner (2008)
Jakkamma (1972)
Jakkanna (2016)
Jako kníže Rohan (1983)
Jakob the Liar (1999)
Jakob's Wife (2021)

Jal 

Jal (2013)
Jal Bin Machhli Nritya Bin Bijli (1971)
Jal Mahal (1980)
Jalachhayam (2010)
Jalakanyaka (1971)
Jalal's Story (2014)
Jalam (2016)
Jalamarmaram (1999)
Jalan Kembali: Bohsia 2 (2012)
Jalatharangam (1978)
Jalebi (2018)
Jalisco Sings in Seville (1949)
Jalitgeola (1927)
Jalla! Jalla! (2000)
Jallaad (1995)
Jallian Wala Bagh (1977)
Jallikattu (1987)
Jallikattu Kaalai (1994)
Jalna (1935)
Jalolsavam (2004)
Jalopy (1953)
Jalpari: The Desert Mermaid (2012)
Jalsa: (2008 & 2016)
Jalsaghar (1958)
Jalte Badan (1973)
Jalti Nishani (1932)

Jam 

Jam (2006)
Jam Session (1942, 1944 & 1999)
A Jamaâ (2010)
 Jamadagni (1988)
Jamai 420 (2015)
Jamai Badal (2019)
Jamai Raja (1990)
Jamai Shashthi (1931)
Jamaibabu Jindabad (2001)
Jamaica Inn (1939)
Jamaica Motel (2006)
Jamaica Run (1953)
Jamba Lakidi Pamba: (1992 & 2018)
Jambhavan (2006)
Jamboo (1980)
Jamboo Savari (2014)
Jamboree: (1944 & 1957)
Jambulingam (1982)
Jambulingam 3D (2016)
Jambyl (1953)
Jameen Kottai (1995)
James: (2005, 2008 & 2022)
James & Alice (2016)
James Blunt: Return to Kosovo (2007)
James Bond: (1999 & 2015)
James Bond series:
Casino Royale (1967 & 2006)
Diamonds Are Forever (1971)
Die Another Day (2002)
Dr. No (1962)
For Your Eyes Only (1981)
From Russia with Love (1963)
GoldenEye (1995)
Goldfinger (1964)
Licence to Kill (1989)
Live and Let Die (1973)
The Living Daylights (1987)
The Man with the Golden Gun (1974)
Moonraker (1979)
No Time to Die (2021)
Octopussy (1983)
On Her Majesty's Secret Service (1969)
Quantum of Solace (2008)
Skyfall (2012)
Spectre (2015)
The Spy Who Loved Me (1977)
Thunderball (1965)
Tomorrow Never Dies (1997)
A View to a Kill (1985)
The World Is Not Enough (1999)
You Only Live Twice (1967)
James Dean: (1976 & 2001)
James Dean: The First American Teenager (1976)
The James Dean Story (1957)
James and the Giant Peach (1996)
James Joyce's Women (1985)
James White (2015)
James' Journey to Jerusalem (2003)
Jamesy Boy (2014)
Jamie Marks Is Dead (2014)
Jamila, the Algerian (1958)
Jamila dan Sang Presiden (2009)
The Jammed  (2007)
Jammin' the Blues (1944)
Jamna Par (1946)
Jamna Pyari (2015)
Jamón, jamón (1992)
Jamuna Kinare (1984)

Jan 

Jan Amos Comenius (1983)
Jan Dara (2001)
Jan Dara the Beginning (2012)
Jan Dara: The Finale (2013)
Jan Hus: (1954 & 2015)
Jan Vermeulen, the Miller of Flanders (1917)
Jan Źiźka (1955)
Jana (2004)
Jana Aranya (1976)
Jana Gana Mana (2012)
Janaadhipan (2019)
Janaan (2016)
Janakan (2010)
Janakeeya Kodathi (1985)
Janakiraman (1997)
Janala (2009)
Janam: (1985 & 1993)
Janam Janam Ke Saath (2007)
Janam Janam Na Saath (1977)
Janam Kundli (1995)
Janam Se Pehle (1994)
Jananam (2004)
Janani: (1993 & 2006)
Janani Janmabhoomi (1984)
Janapriyan (2011)
Janasheen (2003)
Janatar Aadalat (2008)
Janathipathyam (1997)
Janbaaz (1986)
Janda Pai Kapiraju (2015)
Jandamarra's War (2011)
Jandek on Corwood (2004)
Jane: (1915, 2016 & 2017)
The Jane Austen Book Club (2007)
Jane Austen's Mafia! (1998)
Jane Doe (2001)
Jane Eyre: (1910, 1934, 1943, 1970 TV, 1973 TV, 1983 TV, 1996, 1997 & 2011)
Jane Got a Gun (2015)
Jane and the Lost City (1987 TV)
Jane Shore (1915)
Jane Steps Out (1938)
Jane Wants a Boyfriend (2015)
Jane White Is Sick & Twisted (2002)
Jane's House (1994)
Janeane from Des Moines (2012)
Jangan Pandang Belakang (2007)
Jangan Pandang Belakang Congkak (2009)
Janghwa Hongryeon jeon: (1924, 1936, 1956 & 1972)
Jango (1984)
Jani (2017)
Janice Beard (1999)
Janice Meredith (1924)
Janie: (1944 & 2006)
Janika (1949)
Janji Joni (2005)
Janky Promoters (2009)
Jannat (2008)
Jannat 2 (2012)
The January Man (1989)

Jao–Jar 

Jaoon Kahan Bata Ae Dil (2018)
Japan (2002)
Japan Japan (2007)
Japan, Our Homeland (2006)
Japan Yin Thwe (1935)
Japan's Longest Day (1967)
Japanese Devils (2001)
The Japanese Dog (2013)
Japanese Girls Never Die (2016)
A Japanese Idyll (1912)
A Japanese Nightingale (1918)
Japanese Relocation (1942)
Japanese Story (2003)
A Japanese Tragedy (1953)
Japanese War Bride (1952)
The Japanese Wife (2010)
The Japanese Woman (1919)
Japanil Kalyanaraman (1985)
Japón (2002)
Japon İşi (1987)
Jappeloup (2013)
Jaque Mate (2011)
The Jar (1984)
The Jar: A Tale From the East (2001)
Jar City (2006)
Jara Bristite Bhijechhilo (2007)
Jarasandha (2011)
Jargo (2004)
Jarhead (2005)
Jarka a Věra (1938)
Jarní vody (1968)
Jarosław Dąbrowski (1976)
Jarrett (1973 TV)
Jarum Halus (2008)
Jarvik (2019)

Jas–Jav 

Jasamine Freckel's Love Affair (1921)
Jasmine (2015)
Jasmine Women (2004)
Jaśnie pan szofer (1935)
Jason and the Argonauts (1963)
Jason Becker: Not Dead Yet (2012)
Jason Bourne (2016)
Jason Goes to Hell: The Final Friday (1993)
Jason and Shirley (2015)
Jason Takes Manhattan (1989)
Jason X (2002)
Jason's Letter (2017)
Jason's Lyric (1994)
Jasper Goes Hunting (1944)
Jasper and the Haunted House (1942)
Jasper in a Jam (1946)
Jasper Jones (2017)
Jasper, Texas (2003)
Jassy (1947)
Jatagam (1953)
Jathara (1980)
Jathi (2005)
Jathi Ratnalu (2021)
Jatinga Ityadi (2007)
Jatra (2016)
Jatra: Hyalagaad Re Tyalagaad (2006)
Jatrai Jatra (2019)
Jatt James Bond (2014)
Jatt & Juliet (2012)
Jatt & Juliet 2 (2013)
Jatt Pardesi (2015)
Jatt Punjab Daa (1992)
Jatt Te Dogar (1983)
Jatta (2013)
Jatts In Golmaal (2013)
Jattu Engineer (2017)
Jatugriha (1964)
Jauja (2014)
Una Jaula no tiene secretos (1962)
Jaundya Na Balasaheb (2016)
Java Head: (1923 & 1934)
Java Heat (2013)
Javier's Passion (2019)

Jaw–Jaz 

Jawaan (2017)
Jawaani (1984)
Jawaani Jaaneman (2020)
Jawab: (1942, 1970 & 1995)
Jawai Maaza Bhala (2008)
Jawan (2023)
Jawan Ki Pukar (1942)
Jawan Mohabbat (1971)
Jawan of Vellimala (2012)
Jawani (1942)
Jawani Diwani (1972)
Jawani Diwani: A Youthful Joyride (2006)
Jawani Ka Rang (1941)
Jawani Ki Hawa (1935)
Jawani Phir Nahi Ani series:
Jawani Phir Nahi Ani (2015)
Jawani Phir Nahi Ani 2 (2018)
Jawani Zindabaad (2010)
Jawani Zindabad (1990)
Jawbone (2017)
Jawbreaker (1999)
Jawker Dhan (2017)
Jaws series:
Jaws (1975)
Jaws 2 (1978)
Jaws 3-D (1983)
Jaws: The Revenge (1987)
Jaws of Death (2005)
Jaws in Japan (2009)
Jaws of Justice (1933)
Jaws of Satan (1982)
Jaws of Steel (1927)
The Jay Bird (1920)
Jay Jay (2003)
Jay and Seth versus the Apocalypse (2007)
Jay and Silent Bob Reboot (2019)
Jay and Silent Bob Strike Back (2001)
Jay & Silent Bob's Super Groovy Cartoon Movie (2013)
Jaya (2002)
Jaya Ganga (1996)
Jaya Janaki Nayaka (2017)
Jaya Jaya Jaya Jaya Hey (2022)
Jaya Pita Jaya (2010)
Jaya Sri Amathithuma (2019)
Jayabheri (1959)
Jayadeb (1962)
Jayakodi (1940)
Jayam: (1999, 2002 & 2003)
Jayam Manade: (1956 & 1986)
Jayam Manadera (2000)
Jayamkondaan (2008)
Jayamma Panchayathi (2022)
Jayammana Maga (2013)
Jayammu Nischayammu Raa: (1989 & 2016)
Jayantabhai Ki Luv Story (2013)
Jayanti (2021)
Jayaprada (1939)
Jayeshbhai Jordaar (2022)
Jayasimha: (1955 & 1987)
Jayeebhava (2009)
Jayhawkers (2014)
The Jayhawkers! (1959)
Jayikkaanaay Janichavan (1978)
The Jayne Mansfield Story (1980 TV)
Jayne Mansfield's Car (2012)
Jazbaa (2015)
Jazbaat: (1980 & 1994)
Jazz All Around (1969)
Jazz Boat (1960)
The Jazz Cinderella (1930)
The Jazz Girl (1926)
Jazz Heaven (1929)
Jazz and Jailbirds (1919)
Jazz Mad (1928)
Jazz Mama (2010)
Jazz Musume Tanjō (1957)
Jazz Is My Native Language (1983)
Jazz Rhythm (1930)
The Jazz Singer: (1927, 1952 & 1980)
Jazz on a Summer's Day (1959)
A Jazzed Honeymoon (1919)
Jazzgossen (1958)
Jazzin' for Blue Jean (1984)
Jazzland (1928)
A Jazzman's Blues (2022)
Jazzmania (1923)

Je 

Je Bho Ramrai Bho (2003)
Je suis Charlie (2015)
Je fais le mort (2013)
Je t'aime John Wayne (2000)
Je l'ai été trois fois (1952)
Je lutte donc je suis (2015)
Je me souviens: (2002 & 2009)
Je Pan Kahish E Sachuj Kahish (2016)
Je Suis Auto (TBD)
Je suis Karl (2021)
Je suis le seigneur du château (1989)
Je suis né d'une cigogne (1999)
Je suis timide mais je me soigne (1978)
Je suis un sentimental (1955)
Je t'aime, je t'aime (1968)
Je t'aime moi non plus (1976)
Je Tu Il Elle (1974)
Je vous aime (1980)
Je vous salue, mafia! (1965)
Je vous trouve très beau (2006)

Jea–Jed 

The Jealous God (2005)
Jealous Husbands (1923)
Jealous James (1914)
Jealous as a Tiger (1964)
Jealousy: (1916, 1922, 1925, 1929, 1932, 1934, 1942, 1945, 1953 Finnish, 1953 Italian, 1999 & 2013)
Jealousy Is My Middle Name (2002)
Jean and the Calico Doll (1910)
Jean Charles (2009)
Jean Chouan (1926)
Jean de Florette (1986)
Jean of the Joneses (2016)
Jean-Michel Basquiat: The Radiant Child (2010)
Jean-Philippe (2006)
Jean's Plan (1946)
Jeanne (1934)
Jeanne d'Arc (1899)
Jeanne Dielman, 23 quai du Commerce, 1080 Bruxelles (1975)
Jeanne Eagels (1957)
Jeannette: The Childhood of Joan of Arc (2017)
Jeannie (1941)
Jeans (1998)
Jebu Donga: (1975 & 1987)
Jed's Trip to the Fair (1916)
Jedenácté přikázání (1935)
Jedda (1955)
Jeder stirbt für sich allein (1962)
Jedermann (1961)
The Jedi Hunter (2002)

Jee 

Jee Aayan Nu (2002)
Jeedar (1981)
Jeem Boom Bhaa (2019)
Jeena Hai Toh Thok Daal (2012)
Jeena Isi Ka Naam Hai (2017)
Jeena Marna Tere Sang (1992)
Jeena Sirf Merre Liye (2002)
Jeena Teri Gali Mein: (1991 & 2013)
Jeena Yahan (1979)
Jeene Do (1990)
Jeene Ki Arzoo (1981)
Jeene Ki Raah (1969)
Jeene Nahi Doonga (1984)
Jeeo Aur Jeene Do (1982)
Jeeo Shaan Se (1997)
Jeepers Creepers: (1939 animated & 1939 live-action)
Jeepers Creepers series:
Jeepers Creepers (2001)
Jeepers Creepers 2 (2003)
Jeepers Creepers 3 (2017)
Jeepers Creepers: Reborn (2022)
Jeerjimbe (2018)
Jeet: (1949, 1972 & 1996)
Jeet Hamaari (1983)
Jeete Hain Shaan Se (1988)
Jeetenge Hum (2011)
Jeeva: (1986, 1988, 1995, 2009 & 2014)
Jeevakke Jeeva (1981)
Jeevan (1944)
Jeevan Baator Logori (2009)
Jeevan Dhaara (1982)
Jeevan Ek Sanghursh (1990)
Jeevan Jyoti (1976)
Jeevan Ki Shatranj (1993)
Jeevan Lata (1936)
Jeevan Mrityu (1970)
Jeevan Mukt (1977)
Jeevan Naiya (1936)
Jeevan Prabhat (1937)
Jeevan Sangram (1974)
Jeevan Sathi (1962)
Jeevan Swapna (1946)
Jeevan Yatra (1946)
Jeevan Yudh (1997)
Jeevana Chaitra (1992)
Jeevana Chakra (1985)
Jeevana Jokali (1972)
Jeevana Jyothi: (1975, 1987 & 1988)
Jeevana Mukthi (1942)
Jeevana Nataka (1943)
Jeevana Poratam (1986)
Jeevana Tarangalu (1973)
Jeevana Teeralu (1977)
Jeevana Tharanga (1963)
Jeevanaamsam (1968)
Jeevanadhi (1996)
Jeevanadi (1970)
Jeevante Jeevan (1985)
Jeevikkan Anuvadikku (1967)
Jeevikkan Marannupoya Sthree (1974)
Jeevitha Chakram (1971)
Jeevitha Nouka (1951)
Jeevitha Samaram (1971)
Jeevitham (1950)
Jeevitham Oru Gaanam (1979)
Jeevithayaathra (1965)
Jeevithe Lassanai (2012)
Jeewan Hathi (2016)
Jeewan Jyoti (1953)
Jeeya Jurir Xubax (2014)

Jef–Jep 

Jefe (2018)
Jeff (1969)
Jeff Gordon, Secret Agent (1963)
Jeff, Who Lives at Home (2012)
Jefferson in Paris (1995)
Jeffrey: (1995 & 2016)
Jeffrey Archer: The Truth (2002)
The Jeffrey Dahmer Files (2012)
Jeg drepte! (1942)
Jeg elsker dig (1957)
Jeg har elsket og levet (1940)
Jekhane Ashray (2009)
Jekhane Bhooter Bhoy (2012)
Jekyll (2007)
Jekyll and Hyde... Together Again (1982)
Jellyfish (2007)
Jellyfish Eyes (2013)
Jem and the Holograms (2015)
Jemima & Johnny (1966)
Jenatsch (1987)
Jenma Natchathram (1991)
Jennie (1940)
Jennie Gerhardt (1933)
The Jennie Project (2001)
Jennifer: (1953 & 1978)
Jennifer 8 (1992)
Jennifer Hale (1937)
Jennifer on My Mind (1971)
Jennifer's Body (2009)
Jenny: (1936, 1958, 1962 TV & 1970 TV)
Jenny Be Good (1920)
Jenny Is a Good Thing (1969)
Jenny Kissed Me (1986)
Jenny Lind (1932)
Jenny and the Soldier (1947)
Jenny's Stroll Through Men (1929)
Jenny's Wedding (2015)
The Jensen Project (2010)
Jenu Goodu (1963)
Jeon Woo-chi: The Taoist Wizard (2009)
Jeopardy (1953)
Jephtah's Daughter: A Biblical Tragedy (1909)
Jeppe på bjerget (1981)

Jer 

Jeremiah (1998 TV)
Jeremiah Johnson (1972)
Jeremy (1973)
Jeremy Hardy vs. the Israeli Army (2003)
Jeremy Scott: The People's Designer (2015)
Jericho: (1937, 1946, 1991 & 2000)
Jericho Mansions (2003)
The Jericho Mile (1979 TV)
Jerichow (2008)
The Jerk (1979)
The Jerk, Too (1984 TV)
The Jerky Boys: The Movie (1995)
Jerky Turkey (1945)
Jerry (2006)
Jerry Before Seinfeld (2017)
Jerry Cotton (2010)
Jerry-Go-Round (1966)
Jerry and the Goldfish (1951)
Jerry, Jerry, Quite Contrary (1966)
Jerry and Jumbo (1953)
Jerry and the Lion (1950)
Jerry Maguire (1996)
Jerry and Tom (1998)
Jerry's Cousin (1951)
Jerry's Diary (1949)
Jerry's Mother-In-Law (1913)
Jersey: (2019 & 2022)
Jersey Boys (2014)
Jersey Girl: (1992 & 2004)
Jersey Shore Shark Attack (2012 TV)
Jerusalem: (1996 & 2013)
Jerusalem Countdown (2011)
The Jerusalem File (1972)
JeruZalem (2015)

Jes 

Jes' Call Me Jim (1920)
Jessabelle (2014)
Jesse James: (1927 & 1939)
Jesse James at Bay (1941)
Jesse James vs. the Daltons (1954)
Jesse James, Jr. (1942)
Jesse James Meets Frankenstein's Daughter (1966)
Jesse James as the Outlaw (1921)
Jesse James Under the Black Flag (1921)
Jesse James' Kid (1965)
Jesse James' Women (1954)
Jesse Owens (2012)
The Jesse Owens Story (1984 TV)
Jesse Stone series:
Stone Cold (2005 TV)
Jesse Stone: Night Passage (2006 TV)
Jesse Stone: Death in Paradise (2006 TV)
Jesse Stone: Sea Change (2007 TV)
Jesse Stone: Thin Ice (2009 TV)
Jesse Stone: No Remorse (2010 TV)
Jesse Stone: Innocents Lost (2011 TV)
Jesse Stone: Benefit of the Doubt (2012 TV)
Jesse Stone: Lost in Paradise (2015 TV)
The Jesse Ventura Story (1999 TV)
Jessica (1962)
Jessicka Rabid (2010)
Jessie (2016)
Jessie's Dad (2011)
The Jester: (1937 & 1988)
The Jester and the Queen (1987)
The Jester's Supper (1942)
A Jester's Tale (1964)
#Jestem M. Misfit (2019)
"#JeSuis" (2018)
Jesus: (1973, 1979, 1999 & 2016)
Jesus Camp (2006)
Jesus Christ Superstar (1973)
Jesus Christ Vampire Hunter (2001)
Jesus Christ's Horoscope (1989)
Jesus Freak (2003)
Jesus Henry Christ (2012)
Jesus Is King (2019)
Jesus of Montreal (1989)
Jesus of Nazareth (1977)
Jesus is a Palestinian (1999)
Jesus People: The Movie (2009)
Jesus Revolution (2023)
The Jesus Rolls (2019)
Jesus – The Film (1986)
Jesus' Son (1999)

Jet–Jez 

Jet Attack (1958)
The Jet Benny Show (1986)
The Jet Cage (1962)
Jet Carrier (1954)
Jet Job (1952)
Jet Lag (2002)
Jet Li's The Enforcer (1995)
Jet Over the Atlantic (1959)
Jet Pilot (1957)
Jet Set (2000)
Jet Storm (1959)
Jete Nahi Dibo (TBD)
Jetpiloter (1961)
Jetsam (2007)
The Jetsons series:
The Jetsons Meet the Flintstones (1987)
Jetsons: The Movie (1990)
The Jetsons & WWE: Robo-WrestleMania! (2017)
Jett Jackson: The Movie (2001)
Jettatore: (1919 & 1938)
Jettchen Gebert's Story (1918)
La jetée (1962)
Jetuka Pator Dore (2011)
Jeu (2006)
Le Jeune Werther (1993)
Jeux d'enfants (2004)
The Jew (1996)
Jew Süss (1934)
Jew Suss: Rise and Fall (2010)
Jewboy (2005)
Jewel: (1915 & 2001)
The Jewel: (1933 & 2011)
The Jewel of the Nile (1985)
A Jewel in Pawn (1917)
Jewel Robbery (1932)
Jewel of the Sahara (2001)
Jewel Thief (1967)
Jewelpet the Movie: Sweets Dance Princess (2012)
Jewels of Brandenburg (1947)
Jewels of Desire (1927)
The Jewess and the Captain (1994)
The Jewess of Toledo (1919)
A Jewish Girl in Shanghai (2010)
The Jewish Steppe (2001)
The Jews (2016)
Jews and Baseball: An American Love Story (2010)
Jews and Buddhism (1999)
Jews of Egypt (2013)
Jews of Iran (2005)
Jews on Land (1927)
Jewtopia (2012)
Jexi (2019)
Jezebel: (1938 & 2019)
The Jezebels (1975)

Jh 

Jhanak Jhanak Payal Baaje (1955)
Jhankaar Beats (2003)
Jhansi Ki Rani (1953)
Jhansi Rani (1988)
Jheel Ke Us Paar (1973)
Jhimma (2021)
Jhinder Bandi (1961)
Jhing Chik Jhing (2010)
Jhol (unreleased)
Jhoola: (1941 & 1962)
Jhoom Barabar Jhoom (2007)
Jhoomar (2007)
Jhoota Kahin Ka (1979)
Jhooth Bole Kauwa Kaate (1998)
Jhootha Hi Sahi (2010)
Jhoothi (1985)
Jhoothi Shaan (1991)
Jhuk Gaya Aasman (1968)
Jhumke (1946)
Jhummandi Naadam (2010)
Jhumroo (1961)
Jhumura (2015)
Jhund (2019)
Jhutha Sach (1984)
Jhuthi Sharm (1940)

Ji 

Ji (2005)

Jia–Jim 

Jia Aur Jia (2017)
Jian Bing Man (2015)
Jiang Hu (2004)
Jiang hu: The Triad Zone (2000)
Jiang Ziya (2020)
Jiao Yulu (1990)
Jiban Maran (1938)
Jiban Saikate (1972)
Jiban Trishna (1957)
Jibon Niye Khela (1999)
Jibon Theke Neya (1970)
Jibril (2018)
Jídlo (1992)
Jig (2011)
Jigar (1992)
Jigariyaa (2014)
Jigarthanda: (2014 & 2016)
Jigarwala (1991)
Jiggs and Maggie series:
Bringing Up Father (1946)
Jiggs and Maggie in Society (1947)
Jiggs and Maggie in Court (1948)
Jiggs and Maggie in Jackpot Jitters (1949)
Jiggs and Maggie Out West (1950)
Jigoku (1960)
Jigoku: Japanese Hell (1999)
Jigokumon (1953)
Jigsaw: (1949, 1962, 1968, 1979, 1989 & 2017)
The Jigsaw Man (1983)
Jihad: A Story of the Others (2015 TV)
A Jihad for Love (2008)
Jihne Mera Dil Luteya (2011)
Jiivi (2019)
Jiivi 2 (2022)
Jil (2015)
Jil Jung Juk (2016)
Jilebi: (2015 & 2017)
Jill Rips (2000)
The Jill & Tony Curtis Story (2008)
Jilmil Jonak (2014)
The Jilt (1922)
Jilted (1987)
Jim & Andy: The Great Beyond (2017)
Jim in Bold (2003)
Jim Brown: All-American (2002)
Jim, the Conqueror (1926)
Jim Dine: A Self-Portrait on the Walls (1995)
Jim Hanvey, Detective (1937)
Jim the Penman: (1915 & 1921)
Jim & Piraterna Blom (1987)
Jim Thorpe – All-American (1951)
Jim the World's Greatest (1976)
Jim: The James Foley Story (2016)
Jim's Atonement (1912)
Jimi Plays Monterey (1986)
Jimi: All Is by My Side (2013)
Jimi Hendrix (1973)
Jiminy Glick in Lalawood (2004)
Jimmie's Millions (1925)
Jimmy: (1979, 2008 & 2013)
Jimmy Boy (1935)
Jimmy, the Boy Wonder (1966)
Jimmy the Gent (1934)
Jimmy Hollywood (1994)
Jimmy and Judy (2006)
Jimmy the Kid (1982)
Jimmy Neutron: Boy Genius (2001)
Jimmy P: Psychotherapy of a Plains Indian (2013)
Jimmy and Sally (1933)
The Jimmy Show (2001)
Jimmy: The Tale of a Girl and Her Bear (1923)
Jimmy Vestvood: Amerikan Hero (2016)
Jimmy Zip (1996)
Jimmy's Hall (2014)
Jimmywork (2004)

Jin–Jiy 

Jin-Roh (1999)
Jina Sikho (1946)
Jindabyne (2006)
Jindalee Lady (1990)
Jindua (2017)
Jingle All the Way: (1996 & 2011 TV)
Jingle All the Way 2 (2014)
Jingle and Bell's Christmas Star (2014 TV)
Jingle Jangle (2020)
Jingles the Clown (2009)
Jingzhe (2004)
Jinn (2013)
Jinnah (1998)
Jinni (2010)
Jinpa (2018)
Jinsei no Yakusoku (2016)
Jinuyo Saraba: Kamuroba Mura e (2015)
Jinx (1919)
Jinx Money (1948)
Jinxed (2013)
Jinxed! (1982)
Jio Pagla (2017)
Jiraiya the Hero (1921)
Jirga (2018)
Jiro Dreams of Sushi (2011)
Jis Desh Mein Ganga Behti Hai (1960)
Jis Desh Mein Ganga Rehta Hain (2000)
Jism: (2003, 2006 & 2016)
Jism 2 (2012)
Jit (1990)
Jithan (2005)
Jithan 2 (2016)
A Jitney Elopement (1915)
Jitterbugs (1943)
Jivaro (1954)
Jive Junction (1943)
Jivin' in Be-Bop (1947)
Jiyo Kaka (2011)
Jiyo To Aise Jiyo (1981)

Jj 

Jjunction (2002)

Jo 

Jo (1971)
Jo Bole So Nihaal (2005)
Jo and the Boy (2015)
Jo Darr Gya Woh Marr Gya (1995)
Jo Jeeta Wohi Sikandar (1992)
Jo Jo Dancer, Your Life Is Calling (1986)
Jo Jo in the Stars (2003)
 Jo Pil-ho: The Dawning Rage (2019)

Joa–Jod 

Joan of Arc: (1900, 1935, 1948 & 2019)
Joan of Arc of Mongolia (1989)
Joan of Arc at the Stake (1954)
Joan Didion: The Center Will Not Hold (2017) 
Joan Does Dynasty (1986)
Joan Lui (1985)
Joan the Maiden (1994)
Joan of Ozark (1942)
Joan of Paris (1942)
Joan of Plattsburg (1918)
Joan Rivers: A Piece of Work (2010)
Joan and the Voices (2011)
Joan the Woman (1916)
Joanna: (1925, 1968 & 2013)
Joanne Lees: Murder in the Outback (2007 TV)
Joaquim (2017)
The Job: (2003 & 2009)
Job, czyli ostatnia szara komórka (2006)
Joba (2019)
Jobs (2013)
Jobson's Luck (1913)
Jocaste (1925)
Jocelyn: (1933 & 1952)
Jock the Hero Dog (2011)
Jockey (2021)
Jocks (1987)
The Jockstrap Raiders (2011)
Jodi: (1999 & 2001)
Jodi Arias: Dirty Little Secret (2013 TV)
Jodi Breakers (2012)
Jodi Kya Banayi Wah Wah Ramji (2003)
Jodi No.1 (2001)
Jodorowsky's Dune (2013)

Joe–Jog 

Joe: (1924, 1970 & 2013)
Joe Bell (2020)
Joe + Belle (2011)
Joe Bullet (1973)
Joe Butterfly (1957)
Joe and Caspar Hit the Road (2015)
Joe Cinque's Consolation (2016)
Joe Dakota: (1957 & 1972)
Joe Dirt (2001)
Joe Dirt 2: Beautiful Loser (2015)
Joe and Ethel Turp Call on the President (1939)
Joe Glow, the Firefly (1941)
Joe Gould's Secret (2000)
Joe Kidd (1972)
Joe the King (1999)
The Joe Louis Story (1953)
Joe MacBeth (1955)
Joe and Max (2002)
Joe the Menace (1955)
Joe the Red (1936)
Joe Somebody (2001)
Joe Strummer: The Future Is Unwritten (2007)
Joe Torre: Curveballs Along the Way (1997 TV)
Joe Versus the Volcano (1990)
Joe's Apartment (1996)
Joe's Bed-Stuy Barbershop: We Cut Heads (1983)
Joe's So Mean to Josephine (1996)
Joe's Violin (2016)
Joey: (1977, 1985, 1986 & 1997)
Joey Boy (1965)
Joffa: The Movie (2010)
Jogajog (2015)
Jogan (1950)
Jogayya (2011)
Joggers' Park (2003)
Jogi (2005)
Jogo de Damas (2015)
Jogwa (2009)

Joh 

Joh's Jury (1993)
Johan (1921)
John A.: Birth of a Country (2011)
John Appa Rao 40 Plus (2008)
John Barleycorn (1914)
John Carter (2012)
John Dies at the End (2012)
John Doe: Vigilante (2014)
John F. Kennedy: Years of Lightning, Day of Drums (1966)
John Halifax (1938)
John Halifax, Gentleman: (1910 & 1915)
John Henry: (2000 & 2020)
John Henry and the Inky-Poo (1946)
John Heriot's Wife (1920)
John and the Hole (2021)
John Hus (1977)
John Jani Janradhan: (1984 & 2016)
John Meade's Woman (1937)
John Paul Jones (1959)
John Q (2002)
John Rabe (2009)
John Smith (1922)
John Tucker Must Die (2006)
John Wesley (1954)
John Wick series:
John Wick (2014)
John Wick: Chapter 2 (2017)
John Wick: Chapter 3 – Parabellum (2019)
John Wick: Chapter 4 (2023)
John Wycliffe: The Morning Star (1984)
Johnno's Dead (2016)
Johnny: (1980, 2003 & 2018)
Johnny 100 Pesos (1993)
Johnny Angel (1945)
Johnny Apollo (1940)
Johnny Belinda: (1948 & 1967 TV)
Johnny Cash! The Man, His World, His Music (1969)
Johnny Come Lately (1943)
Johnny Comes Flying Home (1946)
Johnny Concho (1956)
Johnny Cool (1963)
Johnny Corncob (1973)
Johnny Dangerously (1984)
Johnny Dark (1954)
Johnny Doesn't Live Here Any More (1944)
Johnny Doughboy (1942)
Johnny Eager (1942)
Johnny English series:
Johnny English (2003)
Johnny English Reborn (2011)
Johnny English Strikes Again (2018)
Johnny Frank Garrett's Last Word (2016)
Johnny Frenchman (1945)
Johnny Get Your Gun (1919)
Johnny Get Your Hair Cut (1927)
Johnny Be Good (1988)
Johnny Got His Gun (1971)
Johnny Guitar (1954)
Johnny Handsome (1989)
Johnny Holiday (1949)
Johnny Johnny Yes Papa (2018)
Johnny Kapahala: Back on Board (2007)
Johnny Mad Dog (2008)
Johnny Mnemonic (1995)
Johnny Nobody (1961)
Johnny O'Clock (1947)
Johnny One-Eye (1950)
Johnny Reno (1966)
Johnny Sharma (2008)
Johnny Shiloh (1963) (TV)
Johnny Skidmarks (1998)
Johnny on the Spot (1954)
Johnny Stool Pigeon (1949)
Johnny Suede (1991)
Johnny Tremain (1957)
Johnny Tsunami (1999)
Johnny, You're Wanted (1956)
Johns (1997)
Johnson Family Vacation (2004)
Johny (1993)
Johny I Love You (1982)
Johny Johny Yes Appa (2018)
Johny Mera Naam (1970)
Johny Mera Naam Preethi Mera Kaam (2011)
Johny Tolengo, el majestuoso (1987)

Joi–Jol 

Joi Baba Felunath (1979)
Join the Flumeride (1998)
Join the Marines (1937)
Joint Body (2011)
The Joint Brothers (1986)
Joint Security Area (2000)
Jojo Rabbit (2019)
JoJo's Bizarre Adventure series:
JoJo's Bizarre Adventure: Phantom Blood (2007)
JoJo's Bizarre Adventure: Diamond Is Unbreakable Chapter I (2017)
The Joke (1969)
A Joke of Destiny (1983)
The Joke Thief (2018)
The Joke's on You (1925)
Joker: (1993, 2000, 2012, 2016 & 2019)
The Joker: (1928 & 1960)
The Joker Is Wild (1957)
The Joker King (1935)
Joker: Folie à Deux (2024)
The Jokers (1967)
The Jokes (2004)
Jolanda, the Daughter of the Black Corsair (1953)
Jolanta the Elusive Pig (1945)
Jolene (2008)
Le Joli Mai (1963)
Jolly (1998)
A Jolly Bad Fellow (1964)
Jolly Boy (2011)
The Jolly Boys' Last Stand (2000)
Jolly Fellows: (1934 & 2009)
Jolly Hallo (2001)
Jolly Life (2009)
Jolly Little Elves (1934)
Jolly LLB series:
Jolly LLB (2013)
Jolly LLB 2 (2017)
Jolly Roger: Massacre at Cutter's Cove (2005)
Jolson Sings Again (1949)
The Jolson Story (1946)

Jom–Jor 

Jom kha mung wej (2005)
Jomer Raja Dilo Bor (2015)
Jomfru Trofast (1921)
Jon (1983)
Jonah Hex (2010)
Jonah and the Pink Whale (1995)
Jonah Who Lived in the Whale (1993)
Jonah Who Will Be 25 in the Year 2000 (1976)
Jonah: A VeggieTales Movie (2002)
Jonas Brothers: The 3D Concert Experience (2009)
Jonas in the Jungle (2013)
Jonathan: (1970, 2016 & 2018)
Jonathan of the Bears (1993)
Jonathan Livingston Seagull (1973)
Jonathan: The Boy Nobody Wanted (1992)
Jonathas' Forest (2012)
The Jones Family in Big Business (1937)
The Jones Family in Hollywood (1939)
The Joneses (2010)
The Joneses Have Amateur Theatricals (1909)
Jonestown: Paradise Lost (2007)
Jonestown: The Life and Death of Peoples Temple (2006)
Jongens (2014) (TV)
Jongno (1933)
Joni (1980)
Joni's Promise (2005)
Jonmo Theke Jolchi (1981)
Jonny Quest vs. The Cyber Insects (1995)
Jonny Saves Nebrador (1953)
Jonny's Golden Quest (1993)
Jons und Erdme (1959)
Jonsun and Gonsun (2001)
Jor (2008)
Jora 10 Numbaria (2017)
Joradighir Chowdhury Paribar (1966)
Jordan Is a Hard Road (1915)
Jordon Saffron Taste This! (2009)
Jorge Mautner: O Filho do Holocausto (2012)
Joroo Ka Ghulam (1972)
Joru Ka Ghulam (2000)
Jory (1973)

Jos 

José and Pilar (2010)
José do Telhado: (1929 & 1945)
Josee, the Tiger and the Fish (2003)
Josef (2011)
Josef the Chaste: (1930 & 1953)
Joseph: (1995 & 2018)
Joseph and the Amazing Technicolor Dreamcoat (1999)
Joseph Andrews (1977)
Joseph and the Dreamer (1962)
Joseph: King of Dreams (2000)
Joseph in the Land of Egypt (1932)
Joseph & Mary (2016)
Joseph of Nazareth (2000)
Joseph Smith: The Prophet of the Restoration (2005)
Joseph's Gift (1998)
Josephine (2001)
The Josephine Baker Story (1991)
Josephine and Men (1955)
Josette: (1937 & 1938)
Josh: (2000, 2009 Kannada, 2009 Telugu & 2010)
Josh Jarman (2004)
Josh and S.A.M. (1993)
Josh: Independence Through Unity (2013)
Joshikō (2016)
Joshua: (1976, 2002 & 2007)
Joshua: Teenager vs. Superpower (2017)
Joshua Then and Now (1985)
Joshua Tree (1993)
Joshy (2016)
Josie (2018)
Josie and the Pussycats (2001)
Josselyn's Wife: (1919 & 1926)
Josser in the Army (1932)
Josser on the Farm (1934)
Josser Joins the Navy (1932)
Josser on the River (1932)

Jot–Jou 

Jothe Jotheyali (2006)
Jothegara (2010)
Jothi: (1939 & 2022)
Le Jouet criminel (1969)
Jour de fête (1949)
Le Jour se Leve (1940)
Journal of a Crime (1934)
A Journal for Jordan (2021)
Journalist (1979)
The Journalist: (1967 & 1979)
The Journals of Knud Rasmussen (2006)
The Journals of Musan (2011)
Journey: (1972 & 1995 TV)
The Journey: (1942, 1959, 1986, 1992, 1995, 2004, 2014 Malaysian, 2016 & 2017)
Journey 2: The Mysterious Island (2012)
Journey of Akaki (1912)
Journey Among Women (1977)
Journey to Ararat (2011)
Journey to Arzrum (1936)
The Journey of August King (1995)
Journey Back to Oz (1972)
Journey Back to Youth (2001)
Journey Beneath the Desert (1961)
Journey Beyond Sodor (2017)
Journey Beyond Three Seas (1957)
Journey of Bhangover (2017)
A Journey Called Love (2002)
Journey to the Center of the Earth: (1959, 1989, 1993 TV, 2008 TV, 2008 direct-to-video & 2008)
A Journey to the Center of the Earth (1977)
Journey into Darkness (1968 TV)
Journey to the End of the Night (2006)
Journey from the Fall (2006)
Journey into Fear: (1943 & 1975)
A Journey of Happiness (2019)
The Journey Home (2014)
Journey of Hope (1990)
Journey to Italy (1954)
The Journey of Jared Price (2000)
The Journey of Karma (2018)
Journey into Life: The World of the Unborn (1990)
Journey into Light (1951)
A Journey to London (1975 TV)
Journey for Margaret (1942)
Journey into Medicine (1947)
The Journey to Melonia (1989)
The Journey of Natty Gann (1985)
Journey into the Night (1921)
Journey Out of Darkness (1967)
Journey to Paradise Falls (2009)
The Journey of Punjab 2016 (2016)
Journey of a Red Fridge (2007)
A Journey of Samyak Buddha (2013)
Journey into Self (1968)
Journey into Spring (1958)
Journey for Survival (1981)
Journey Through China (2015)
A Journey Through Fairyland (1985)
A Journey Through Filmland (1921)
Journey Through the Past (1973)
Journey Through Rosebud (1972)
The Journey to Tilsit (1939)
Journey Together (1945)
Journey to the West: Conquering the Demons (2013)
The Journey of a Young Composer (1985)
Journey from Zanskar (2010)
Journey's End: (1930, 2010 & 2017)
Journeyman (2017)

Jov–Joy 

Joven, viuda y estanciera (1970)
Jowable (2019)
Joy: (2010 & 2015)
Joy Division: (2006 & 2007)
Joy and the Dragon (1916)
Joy of Fatherhood (2014)
The Joy Girl (1927)
Joy House (1964)
Joy of Learning (1969)
The Joy of Life (2005)
The Joy of Living (1961)
The Joy Luck Club (1993)
Joy in the Morning (1965)
Joy Ride: (1935 & 2000)
Joy Ride series:
Joy Ride (2001)
Joy Ride 2: Dead Ahead (2008)
Joy Ride 3 (2014)
Joy Scouts (1939)
Joy Street (1929)
The Joy That Kills (1984)
Joy de V. (2013)
Joyeux Noël (2005)
Joyful Journeys (2018)
Joyful Noise (2012)
Joyjatra (2004)
Joyless Street (1925)
Joymoti: (1935 & 2006)
The Joyous Liar (1919)
Joyride: (1977, 1997 & 2005)
The Joyriders (1999)
Joys of the Youth (1987)
Joysticks (1983)

Ju 

Ju Dou (1990)
Ju-On series:
Ju-On: The Curse (2000)
Ju-On: The Curse 2 (2000)
Ju-On: The Grudge (2002)
Ju-On: The Grudge 2 (2003)
Ju-On: White Ghost (2009)
Ju-On: Black Ghost (2009)
Ju-On: The Beginning of the End (2014)
Ju-On: The Final Curse (2015)
Ju-Rei: The Uncanny (2004)

Jua–Jud 

Juan Apóstol, el más amado (2019)
Juan of the Dead (2010)
Juan Moreira: (1936, 1948 & 1973)
Juan Pistolas: (1936 & 1966)
Juan que reía (1976)
Juan Simón's Daughter: (1935 & 1957)
Juan Tamad at Mister Shooli sa Mongolian Barbecue (1991)
Juan & Ted: Wanted (2000)
Juanita: (1935 & 2019)
Juanito (1960)
Juarez (1939)
Juarez 2045 (2017)
Juarez and Maximillian (1934)
Jubal (1956)
Jubiabá (1986)
Jubilee (1978)
Jubilee Bunt-a-thon (2012)
The Jubilee of Mr Ikel (1955)
Jubilee Trail (1954)
Jubilee Window (1935)
Jubilo (1919)
Jubilo, Jr. (1924)
The Jucklins (1921)
Jucy (2010)
Jud Süß (1940)
Judaai: (1980 & 1997)
Judas: (1930, 1936, 2001 & 2004)
Judas and the Black Messiah (2021)
Judas Ghost (2013)
Judas Kiss: (1998 & 2011)
Judas' Kiss (1954)
The Judas Project (1990)
The Judas of Tyrol (1933)
Jude (1996)
Judex: (1916, 1934 & 1963)
The Judge: (1921, 1960, 1984 & 2014)
The Judge and the Assassin (1976)
Judge for a Day (1935)
Judge Dredd (1995)
Judge and the Forest (1975)
The Judge and the General (2008)
Judge Hardy and Son (1939)
Judge Hardy's Children (1938)
The Judge and Jake Wyler (1972 TV)
Judge Not: (1914 & 1920)
Judge Not; or The Woman of Mona Diggings (1915)
Judge Priest (1934)
The Judge Steps Out (1948)
Judgement: (1990 TV, 1992, 1999 & 2020)
The Judgement Book (1935)
Judgement Day: (1949, 1988 & 2013)
Judgment (1990)
The Judgment (2014)
The Judgment House (1917)
Judgment in Berlin (1988)
Judgment Day (1999)
Judgment Night (1993)
Judgment at Nuremberg (1961)
Judith: (1923 & 1966)
Judwaa (1997)
Judy (2019)
Judy Berlin (1999)
Judy and Punch (2019)

Jue–Jum 

Juego de Héroes (2016)
Juego de Niños (1995)
Juego peligroso (1967)
Jug Band Hokum (2015)
Jug Face (2013)
Jugaadi Dot Com (2015)
Jugaari (2010)
Le Juge Fayard dit Le Shériff (1977)
Juggernaut: (1936 & 1974)
The Juggler (1953)
Jugni: (2011 & 2016)
Jugnu: (1947 & 1973)
Juha: (1937 & 1999)
Juice (1992)
Juicio de faldas (1969)
Juke-Bar (1989)
Juke Box Jenny (1942)
Juke Box Rhythm (1959)
Juke box urli d'amore (1959)
Juke Girl (1942)
Juke Joint (1947)
Jukti Takko Aar Gappo (1974)
Jules and Jim (1961)
Jules of the Strong Heart (1918)
Jules Verne's Mysterious Island: (1961 & 2012 TV)
Julia: (1974, 1977, 2008, 2014 & 2021)
Julia's Eyes (2010)
Julia Has Two Lovers (1991)
Julian Bond: Reflections from the Frontlines of the Civil Rights Movement (2012)
Juliana (1988)
Julie: (1956, 1975, 1998, 2004 & 2006)
Julie 2 (2017)
Julie & Julia (2009)
Julie and Me (1998)
Julie Walking Home (2002)
Julien Donkey-Boy (1999)
Juliet, Naked (2018)
Juliet of the Spirits (1965)
Julieta (2016)
Julietta (1953)
Juliette, or Key of Dreams (1951)
Julieum 4 Perum (2017)
Julio comienza en julio (1979)
Julius Caesar: (1914, 1950, 1953 & 1970)
Julius Caesar Against the Pirates (1962)
Julot the Apache (1921)
July 4 (2007)
July 7 (2016)
July Days (1923)
July Kaatril (2019)
July Rain (1967)
July Rhapsody (2002)
Jumanji franchise:
Jumanji (1995)
Jumanji: Welcome to the Jungle (2017)
Jumanji: The Next Level (2019)
Jumbo (2008)
Jump: (1999, 2009 & 2012)
Jump! (2007)
Jump Britain (2005 TV)
Jump for Glory (1937)
Jump the Gun (1997)
Jump into Hell (1955)
Jump In! (2007 TV)
Jump London (2003 TV)
Jumper: (1991 & 2008)
Jumpin' at the Boneyard (1992)
Jumpin' Jack Flash (1986)
Jumpin' Jupiter (1955)
Jumping (1986)
Jumping the Broom (2011)
Jumping Into the Abyss (1933)
Jumping Jacks (1952)
Jumping for Joy (1956)
Jumping Ship (2001)
Jumpman (2018)

Jun 

Junction (2012)
The Junction Boys (2002 TV)
Junction City (1952)
June (2019)
 June 9 (2008)
June 17th, 1994 (2010)
June Night (1940)
Junebug (2005)
Jung: (1996 & 2000)
Jung Baaz (1989)
Junga (2018)
Jungfer, Sie gefällt mir (1969)
The Jungle: (1914, 1952, & 1967)
Jungle: (2000 & 2017)
Jungle 2 Jungle (1997)
Jungle Adventurer (1965)
The Jungle Book: (1942, 1967, 1994 & 2016)
The Jungle Book: Mowgli's Story (1998)
The Jungle Book 2 (2003)
A Jungle Book of Regulations (1974)
Jungle Boy: (1987 & 1998)
Jungle Bride (1933)
The Jungle Bunch (2017)
Jungle Captive (1945)
Jungle Cat (1960)
Jungle Cavalcade (1941)
Jungle Child (2011)
Jungle Cruise (2021)
Jungle Emperor Leo (1997)
Jungle Fever (1991)
Jungle Flight (1947)
Jungle Gents (1954)
Jungle Goddess (1948)
Jungle Headhunters (1951)
Jungle Heat (1957)
Jungle Hell (1955)
Jungle Holocaust (1977)
Jungle Jim (1948)
Jungle Jim in the Forbidden Land (1952)
Jungle Jingles (1929)
Jungle Jitters (1938)
Jungle Ka Jawahar (1953)
Jungle Ka Qanoon (1995)
Jungle Ki Beti (1988)
Jungle Ki Pukar (1946)
The Jungle King (1994)
Jungle Love (1990)
Jungle Man (1941)
Jungle Man-Eaters (1954)
Jungle Manhunt (1951)
Jungle Master (2013)
Jungle Moon Men (1955)
Jungle Mystery (1932)
Jungle Patrol: (1944 & 1948)
The Jungle Princess (1936)
Jungle Raiders (1985)
Jungle Rhythm (1929)
Jungle Shuffle (2014)
Jungle Siren (1942)
Jungle Stampede (1950)
Jungle Street (1960)
Jungle Warriors (1984)
Jungle Woman: (1926 & 1944)
Junglee: (1961, 2009 & 2019)
Junglee Tarzan (2001)
Jungleland (2019)
Junior: (1994 & 2008)
Junior Army (1942)
Junior Bonner (1972)
The Junior Defenders (2007)
Junior G-Men (1940)
Junior G-Men of the Air (1942)
Junior High School (1978)
Junior Mandrake (1997)
Junior Miss (1945)
Junior Prom (1946)
Junior Senior: (2002 & 2005)
Juniper Tree (2003)
The Juniper Tree (1990)
Junk (1999)
Junk Mail (1997)
The Junk Shop (1965)
The Junkman (1982)
The Junky's Christmas (1993)
Junkyard Dog (2010)
Juno (2007)
Juno and the Paycock (1930)
Junoon: (1978 & 1992)

Jup–Juw 

Jupiter Ascending (2015)
Jupiter's Darling (1955)
Jupiter's Moon (2017)
Jupiter's Thigh (1980)
El Juramento de Lagardere (1955)
Jurassic Park series:
Jurassic Park (1993)
The Lost World: Jurassic Park (1997)
Jurassic Park III (2001)
Jurassic World (2015)
Jurassic World: Fallen Kingdom (2018)
Jurassic World Dominion (2022)
Jurassic Shark (2012)
Jurm: (1990 & 2005)
Jurmana: (1979 & 1996)
The Juror (1996)
Juror 8 (2019)
Jurrat (1991)
Jury Duty (1995)
The Jury of Fate (1917)
Jury's Evidence (1936)
The Jury's Secret (1938)
Jus primae noctis (1972)
Jushin Thunder Liger: Fist of Thunder (1995)
Jusqu'à toi (2009)
Jusqu'au bout de la nuit (1995)
Just Across the Street (1952)
Just Add Water (2008)
Just Another Blonde (1926)
Just Another Day: (2008 & 2009)
Just Another Girl on the I.R.T. (1992)
Just Another Love Story (2007)
Just Another Margin (2014)
Just Another Missing Kid (1981)
Just Another Pandora's Box (2010)
Just Another Romantic Wrestling Comedy (2006)
Just Any Woman (1949)
Just Around the Corner: (1921 & 1938)
Just Ask for Diamond (1988)
Just Before Dawn: (1946 & 1981)
Just Before I Go (2014)
Just Before Losing Everything (2013)
Just Before Nightfall (1971)
Just Behind the Door (1984)
Just Between Friends (1986)
Just Between Us (2010)
Just Beyond This Forest (1991)
Just a Breath Away (2018)
Just Broke Up (2008)
Just Buried (2007)
Just Business (2008)
Just Call Me Nobody (2010)
Just Cause (1995)
Just Desserts (2004 TV)
Just Dogs (1932)
Just Dropped In (1919)
Just Ducky (1951)
Just an Echo (1934)
Just Follow Law (2007)
Just Friends: (1993 & 2005 & 2018)
Just Friends? (2009)
Just for Fun (1963)
Just a Game (1983)
Just Getting Started (2017)
Just a Gigolo: (1931 & 1978)
Just a Girl (1916)
Just Go with It (2011)
Just Gold (1913)
Just Henry (2011)
Just Heroes (1989)
Just Imagine (1930)
Just Inès (2010)
Just Jim: (1915 & 2015)
Just Joe (1960)
Just for Kicks: (2003 & 2005)
Just a Kiss (2002)
Just Let Go (2015)
Just a life – the story of Fridtjof Nansen (1968)
Just Like Brothers (2012)
Just Like Heaven (2005)
Just Like Our Parents (2017)
Just Like the Son (2006)
Just Like Us (2010)
Just Like a Woman: (1912, 1923, 1939, 1967, 1992 & 2012)
Just a Little Harmless Sex (1999)
Just a Little Inconvenience (1977 TV)
Just Looking (1999)
Just Love Me (2006)
Just Maath Maathalli (2010)
Just Maduveli (2015)
Just Married: (1928, 2003 & 2007)
Just a Matter of Duty (1993)
Just Me and You (1978)
Just, Melvin: Just Evil (2000)
Just Mercy (2019)
Just Mickey (1930)
Just My Luck: (1933, 1936, 1957 & 2006)
Just Neighbors (1919)
Just Not Married (2016)
Just Nuts (1915)
Just Off Broadway: (1924, 1929 & 1942)
Just Once a Great Lady: (1934 & 1957)
Just for One Day (2008)
Just One Drink (2015)
Just One of the Girls (1993)
Just One of the Guys (1985)
Just One Look (2002)
Just One More Time (1974)
Just Out of Reach (1979)
Just Pals (1920)
Just Peck (2009)
Just Peggy (1918)
A Just Punishment (1914)
Just a Question of Love (2000 TV)
Just Rambling Along (1918)
Just Say Hi (2013)
Just Sex and Nothing Else (2005)
Just Sue Me (2000)
Just Suppose (1926)
Just Tell Me What You Want (1980)
Just This Once (1952)
Just the Ticket (1999)
Just in Time (1997)
Just for Tonight (1918)
Just Us (1986 TV)
Just Visiting (2001)
Just a Walk in the Park (2002 TV)
Just Walking (2008)
Just Watch Me: Trudeau and the '70s Generation (1999)
Just William (1940)
Just William's Luck (1947)
Just a Woman: (1918 & 1925)
Just Wright (2010)
Just Write (1997)
Just for You: (1952 & 2017)
Just You and Me, Kid (1979)
Justice: (1914, 1917, 1993, & 2002 short)
Justice League (2017)
Justice League Dark (2017)
Justice League Dark: Apokolips War (2020)
Justice League vs. the Fatal Five (2019)
Justice League vs. Teen Titans (2016)
Justice League: Crisis on Two Earths (2010)
Justice League: Doom (2012)
Justice League: The Flashpoint Paradox (2013)
Justice League: Gods and Monsters (2015)
Justice League: The New Frontier (2008)
Justice League: Throne of Atlantis (2015)
Justice League: War (2014)
Justice, My Foot! (1992)
Justin Bieber: Never Say Never (2011)
Justine (1969)
Jutra (2014)
Jutro idziemy do kina (2007 TV)
Juvana (2013)
Juvana 2: Terperangkap Dalam Kebebasan (2015)
Juvenile (2000)
Juvenile Court (film) (1938)
The Juvenile Judge (1960)
Juvenile Jungle (1958)
Juvenile Liaison (1975)
Juvenile Offender (2012)
Juvenilia (1943)
Juwanna Mann (2002)

Jw–Jy 

Jwaalamukhi (1985)
Jwaar Bhata (1973)
Jwala: (1969 & 1971)
Jwala Daku (1981)
Jwala Dweepa Rahasyam (1965)
Jwalamukhi: (1980 & 2000)
Jwanita (2015)
Jwar Bhata: (1944 & 1973)
Jwlwi: The Seed (2019)
Jyeshta (2004)
Jyeshthoputro (2019)
Jyot Jale (1973)
Jyothi (1976)
Jyothi Lakshmi (2015)
Jyoti: (1981 & 1988)
Jyoti Bane Jwala (1980)
Jyotibacha Navas (1975)

K 

K (2002)
K: Missing Kings (2014)
K-11 (2012)
K-13 (2019)
K-19: The Widowmaker (2002)
K2 (1991)
K2: Siren of the Himalayas (2012)
K-20: Legend of the Mask (2008)
K3 en de Kattenprins (2007)
K3 en het ijsprinsesje (2006)
K3 en het Magische Medaillon (2004)
K-9 (1989)
K-9: P.I. (2002)
K-911 (1999)
KD No:1 (1978)
K.G.F: Chapter 1 (2018)
KIL (2014)
KL 10 Patthu (2015)
KL Gangster (2011)
KL Gangster 2 (2013)
KL Special Force (2018)
KLK Calling PTZ – The Red Orchestra (1971)
K-PAX (2001)
KT (2002)

Ka 

 Ka Kee (1980)
 Ka Kha Ga Gha (2018)
 Ka Kha Ga Gha Umo (1970)

Kaa 

Kaa (1965)
Kaabil (2017)
Kaada Beladingalu (2007)
Kaadaaru Maasam (1976)
Kaadal Kahaani (2022)
Kaadhal: (1952 & 2004)
Kaadhal Kavithai (1998)
Kaadhal Kondein (2003)
Kaadhal Mannan (1998)
Kaadhal Oviyam (1982)
Kaadhal Solla Vandhen (2010)
Kaadhale Nimmadhi (1998)
Kaadhali (1997)
Kaadu: (1952, 1973 Kannada, 1973 Malayalam & 2014)
Kaadu Kudure (1979)
Kaadu Pookkunna Neram (2016)
Kaaf Kangana (2019)
Kaafi Thota (2017)
Kaafila (2007)
Kaafiron Ki Namaaz (2016)
Kaagaz (2019)
Kaagaz Ke Fools (2015)
Kaagaz Ke Phool (1959)
Kaagaz Ki Nao (1975)
Kaahalam (1981)
Kaajal (1965)
Kaaka Muttai (2015)
Kaakan (2015)
Kaakha Kaakha (2003)
Kaaki Sattai (2015)
Kaakki Sattai (2015)
Kaakka (2021)
Kaakum Karangal (1965)
Kaal: (2005 & 2007)
Kaal Madhumas (2013)
Kaal Sandhya (1997)
Kaala: (2017 & 2018)
Kaala Aadmi (1978)
Kaala Koothu (2018)
Kaala Patthar (1979)
Kaala Rathri (1987)
Kaala Samrajya (1999)
Kaala Sona (1975)
Kaalai (2008)
Kaalaiyum Neeye Maalaiyum Neeye (1988)
Kaalakaandi (2018)
Kaalal Pada (1989)
Kaalam: (1981 & 1982)
Kaalam Kaathu Ninnilla (1979)
Kaalam Maari Kadha Maari (1987)
Kaalam Maari Pochu: (1956 & 1996)
Kaalamellam Kaathiruppen (1997)
Kaalamellam Kadhal Vaazhga (1997)
Kaalangalil Aval Vasantham (1976)
Kaalapani (1996)
Kaalbela (2009)
Kaalchilambu (2018)
Kaali: (1980 & 2018)
Kaalia: (1981 & 1997)
Kaalinga (1980)
Kaaliya Mardhanam (1982)
Kaama (1999)
Kaamam Krodham Moham (1975)
Kaamana Billu (1983)
Kaamannana Makkalu (2008)
Kaamchor (1982)
Kaamyab (1984)
Kaanaakkinaavu (1996)
Kaanal Neer (1961)
Kaanatha Veshangal (1967)
Kaanathaya Penkutty (1985)
Kaanch Ki Deewar (1986)
Kaanchi: The Unbreakable (2014)
Kaanchi Thalaivan (1963)
Kaand: Black Scandal (2013)
Kaante (2002)
Kaantha Valayam (1980)
Kaapalika (1973)
Kaappaan (2019)
Kaaryasthan (2010)
Kaash: (1987 & 2015)
Kaashh (2012)
Kaashi in Search of Ganga (2018)
Kaashmora (2016)
Kaasi (2004)
Kaasua, komisario Palmu! (1961)
Kaaterskill Falls (2001)
Kaathadi (2018)
Kaathala Kaathala (1998)
Kaathil Oru Kinnaram (1996)
Kaathirunna Divasam (1983)
Kaathirunna Nimisham (1978)
Kaathirupaen Unakaaha (1977)
Kaathiruppor Pattiyal (2018)
Kaatrin Mozhi (2018)
Kaatrinile Varum Geetham (1978)
Kaatru Veliyidai (2017)
Kaatrukkenna Veli (2001)
Kaattaruvi (1983)
Kaatteri (2022)
Kaattile Paattu (1982)
Kaattile Thadi Thevarude Ana (1995)
Kaattu (2017)
Kaattu Kallan (1981)
Kaattu Rani: (1965 & 1985)
Kaattum Mazhayum (2015)
Kaattumaina (1963)
Kaattumallika (1966)
Kaaval (2015)
Kaaval (2021)
Kaaval Dheivam (1969)
Kaaval Nilayam (1991)
Kaavalan (2011)
Kaavalkaaran (1967)
Kaavalmaadam (1980)
Kaavilamma (1977)
Kaaviya Thalaivan (2014)
Kaaviya Thalaivi (1970)
Kaaviyyan (2019)
Kaay Raav Tumhi (2015)
Kaayamkulam Kochunniyude Makan (1976)
Kaazhcha (2004)

Kab 

Kab? Kyoon? Aur Kahan? (1970)
Kab Tak Chup Rahungi (1988)
Kaba Sone Hti (2005)
Kabaddi: (2009 & 2013)
Kabaddi Kabaddi (2015)
Kabaddi Once Again (2012)
Kabadi Kabadi (2001)
Kabadieen! Gekitotsu Dokuro Koko hen (2014)
Kabali (2016)
Kabani Nadi Chuvannappol (1975)
Kabayan, Becomes a Billionaire (2010)
Kabeela (1976)
Kabei: Our Mother (2008)
Kabhi Alvida Naa Kehna (2006)
Kabhi Andhera Kabhi Ujala (1958)
Kabhi Dhoop Kabhi Chhaon (1971)
Kabhi Haan Kabhi Naa (1994)
Kabhi Khushi Kabhie Gham... (2001)
Kabhi Na Kabhi (1998)
Kabhi Pyar Na Karna (2008)
Kabhie Ajnabi The (1985)
Kabhie Kabhie (1976)
Kabhie Tum Kabhie Hum (2002)
Kabir (2018)
Kabir Singh (2019)
Kabisera (2016)
Kabita (1977)
Kabloonak (1994)
Kabluey (2007)
Kaboklei (2009)
Kabooliwala (1993)
Kaboom (2010)
Kaboye Alludu (1987)
Kabrastan (1988)
Kabukicho Love Hotel (2014)
Kabul Express (2006)
Kabula Barabula (2017)
Kabuli Kid (2008)
Kabuliwala: (1957 & 1961)
Kabut Sutra Ungu (1979)
Kabzaa (1988)

Kac 

Kac Wawa (2012)
Kaccha Limboo (2011)
Kacha Devayani (1941)
Kachcha Chor (1977)
Kachche Dhaage (1999)
Kachche Heere (1981)
Kachchi Sadak (2006)
Kachehri (1994)
Kacheri Arambam (2010)

Kad 

Kadachit (2008)
Kadaicha (1988)
Kadaikutty Singam (2018)
Kadaisi Bench Karthi (2017)
Kadaisi Vivasayi (2022)
Kadaksham (2010)
Kadal: (1968 & 2013)
Kadal Kadannu Oru Maathukutty (2013)
Kadal Meengal (1981)
Kadal Pookkal (2001)
Kadala Mage (2006)
Kadaladu Vadaladu (1969)
Kadalai (2016)
Kadalamma (1963)
Kadalkkaattu (1980)
Kadalora Kavithaigal (1986)
Kadalpalam (1969)
Kadamai Kanniyam Kattupaadu (1987)
Kadamba: (1983 & 2004)
Kadamban (2017)
Kadambari (2015)
Kadan Vaangi Kalyaanam (1958)
Kadaram Kondan (2019)
Kadathanaattu Maakkam (1978)
Kadathanadan Ambadi (1990)
Kadathu (1981)
Kadathukaran (1965)
Kadavu (1991)
Kadavul Irukaan Kumaru (2016)
Kadavul Paathi Mirugam Paathi (2015)
Kadavulai Kanden (1963)
Kadavulin Kuzhandhai (1960)
Kadawunu Poronduwa: (1947 & 1982)
Kaddish (1924)
Kaddu Beykat (1975)
Kadeddulu Ekaram Nela (1960)
Kadha, Samvidhanam Kunchakko (2009)
Kadha Paranja Kadha (2018)
Kadha Thudarunnu (2010)
Kadhal 2 Kalyanam (unreleased)
Kadhal Azhivathillai (2002)
Kadhal Desam (1996)
Kadhal Dot Com (2004)
Kadhal Enum Nadhiyinile (1989)
Kadhal FM (2005)
Kadhal Kadhai (2009)
Kadhal Kaditham (2008)
Kadhal Kan Kattudhe (2017)
Kadhal Kasakuthaiya (2017)
Kadhal Kirukkan (2003)
Kadhal Kisu Kisu (2003)
Kadhal Kottai (1996)
Kadhal Palli (1997)
Kadhal Parisu (1987)
Kadhal Pisase (2012)
Kadhal Rojavae (2000)
Kadhal Sadugudu (2003)
Kadhal Samrajyam (unreleased)
Kadhal Vaaganam (1968)
Kadhal Virus (2002)
Kadhalagi (2010)
Kadhalan (1994)
Kadhalar Dhinam (1999)
Kadhale En Kadhale (2006)
Kadhalikka Neramillai (1964)
Kadhalikka Vanga (1972)
Kadhalil Sodhappuvadhu Yeppadi (2012)
Kadhalil Vizhunthen (2008)
Kadhalithal Podhuma (1967)
Kadhaludan (2003)
Kadhalukku Mariyadhai (1997)
Kadhalum Kadandhu Pogum (2016)
Kadhaveedu (2013)
Kadikara Manithargal (2018)
Kadina Benki (1988)
Kadina Rahasya (1969)
Kadinjool Kalyanam (1991)
Kadinte Makkal (1986)
Kado Kendo (2007)
Kadosh (1999)
Kaduvaye Pidicha Kiduva (1977)

Kae–Kah 

Kaena: The Prophecy (2003)
Kaerazaru hibi (1978)
Kaettekita Kogarashi Monjirō (1993)
Kafan (1990)
Kafi's Story (1989)
Kafka (1991)
Kafka au Congo (2010)
Kafr kasem (1975)
Kagaar: Life on the Edge (2003)
Kagbeni (2008)
Kagemusha (1980)
Kagen no tsuki (2004)
Kagojer Bou (2011)
Kagojer Nouka (2013)
Kagojer Phul (TBD)
Kaguya-sama: Love Is War (2019)
Kahaani (2012)
Kahaani 2: Durga Rani Singh (2016)
Kahan Hai Kanoon (1989)
Kahani Ek Chor Ki (1981)
Kahani Hum Sab Ki (1973)
Kahani Kismat Ki: (1973 & 1999)
Kahe Gaye Pardes Piya (2009)
Kahin Aur Chal (1968)
Kahin Chand Na Sharma Jaye (2013 TV)
Kahin Hai Mera Pyar (2014)
Kahin Pyaar Na Ho Jaaye (2000)
Kahit Demonyo Itutumba Ko (2000)
Kahl (1961)
Kaho Naa... Pyaar Hai (2000)
Kahpe Bizans (2000)
Kahte Hain Mujhko Raja (1975)
Kahvalhah Dhaandhen (2002)

Kai 

Kai Kodukkum Kai (1984)
Kai Koduttha Dheivam (1964)
Kai Naattu (1988)
Kai Po Che! (2013)
Kai Rabe gegen die Vatikankiller (1998)
Kai Veesamma Kai Veesu (1989)
Kaidan (2007)
Kaidan Kasane-ga-fuchi (1957)
Kaidan Shin Mimibukuro: Yūrei Mansion (2005)
Kaiju funsen–Daigoro tai Goriasu (1972)
Kaikeyi (1983)
Kaikudunna Nilavu (1998)
Kailan Sasabihing Mahal Kita (1985)
Kailangan Kita (2002)
Kailangan Ko'y Ikaw (2000)
Kailashey Kelenkari (2007)
Kaili Blues (2015)
Kaip Pavogti Žmoną (2013)
Kaise Kahoon Ke... Pyaar Hai (2003)
The Kaiser, the Beast of Berlin (1918)
The Kaiser's Shadow (1918)
Kaiserjäger (1956)
Kaisha monogatari: Memories of You (1988)
Kaithappoo (1978)
Kaithi: (1951 & 2019)
Kaithi Kannayiram (1960)
Kaithiyin Kathali (1963)
Kaivantha Kalai (2006)
Kaiwara Mahathme (1961)
Kaiyethum Doorath (2002)
Kaiyoppu (2007)
Kaiyum Thlayum Purathidaruthe (1985)
Kaizoku Sentai Gokaiger the Movie: The Flying Ghost Ship (2011)
Kaizoku Sentai Gokaiger vs. Space Sheriff Gavan: The Movie (2012)
Kaizokuban Bootleg Film (1999)

Kaj–Kak 

Kajaki (2014)
Kajarya (2015)
Kajillionaire (2020)
Kajraare (2010)
Kaka Ji (2019)
Kakababu Here Gelen? (1995)
Kakabakaba Ka Ba? (1980)
Kakegurui – Compulsive Gambler (2019)
Kakekomi (2015)
Kaki Kitai (2014)
Kakka (1982)
Kakkai Siraginilae (2000)
Kakkakuyil (2001)
Kakkathamburatti (1970)
Kakkathollayiram (1991)
Kakki Sattai (2015)
Kakkoos (2017)
Kakkothikkavile Appooppan Thaadikal (1988)
Kaks' tavallista Lahtista (1960)
Kakshi: Amminippilla (2019)
Kakushi Toride no San-Akunin: The Last Princess (2008)

Kal 

Kal Aaj Aur Kal (1971)
Kal Ho Naa Ho (2003)
Kal Kissne Dekha (2009)
Kal Manja (2011)
Kal: Yesterday and Tomorrow (2005)
Kala Dhanda Goray Log (1986)
Kala Malam Bulan Mengambang (2008)
Kala Pani (1958)
Kala Shah Kala (2019)
Kala Suraj (1985)
Kala Viplavam Pranayam (2018)
Kalaakaar (1983)
Kalaavida (1949)
Kalaayaanulaa (2003)
Kalabha Kadhalan (2006)
Kalabha Mazha (2011)
Kalachakram (1973)
Kalakalappu: (2001 & 2012)
Kalakalappu 2 (2018)
Kalakkura Chandru (2007)
Kalamasseriyil Kalyanayogam (1995)
Kalamity (2010)
Kalangarai Vilakkam (1965)
Kalanjukittiya Thankam (1964)
Kalankini Kankabati (1981)
Kalari (2018)
Kalari Vikraman (2003)
Kalasi Vunte Kaladu Sukham (1961)
Kalasipalya (2004)
Kalat Nakalat (1989)
Kalathur Gramam (2017)
Kalathur Kannamma (1960)
Kalatpadai (2003)
Kalava (1932)
Kalavaadiya Pozhuthugal (2017)
Kalavani (2010)
Kalavani 2 (2019)
Kalavani Mappillai (2018)
Kalavantin (1978)
Kalavar King (2010)
Kalavaram (2014)
Kalavaramaye Madilo (2009)
Kalavari Kodalu (1964)
Kalavari Samsaram (1982)
Kalavathi (1951)
Kalavida (1997)
Kalavu: (2013 & 2019)
Kalavu Thozhirchalai (2017)
Kalay Chor (1991)
Kalaya Tasmai Namaha (2012)
Kalayum Kaminiyum (1963)
Kaleidoscope: (1966, 1990 & 2016)
The Kalemites Visit Gibraltar (1912)
Kali Ganga (1990)
Kali Ghata: (1951 & 1980)
Kali the Little Vampire (2012)
Kalicharan: (1976 & 1988)
Kalidas (1931)
Kalifornia (1993)
Kalika (1980)
Kalikaalam: (1992 & 2012)
Kalikalam (1991)
Kalikkalam (1990)
Kalinga (2006)
Kalinka (2016)
Kalippattam (1993)
Kalippava (1972)
Kaliveedu (1996)
Kaliya Mardan (1919)
Kaliyalla Kalyanam (1968)
Kaliyattam (1997)
Kaliyil Alpam Karyam (1984)
Kaliyodam (1965)
Kaliyoonjal (1997)
Kaliyuga Bheema (1991)
Kaliyuga Kannan (1974)
Kaliyuga Krishnudu (1986)
Kaliyuga Pandavulu (1986)
Kaliyuga Ramudu (1982)
Kaliyuga Seethe (1992)
Kalki: (1984, 1996 & 2019 Malayalam & 2019 Telugu)
Kalla Kulla (1975)
Kalla Malla Sulla (2011)
Kallai FM (2018)
Kallan Kappalil Thanne (1992)
Kallan Pavithran (1981)
Kallang Roar the Movie (2008)
Kallapart (2019)
Kallappadam (2015)
Kallarali Hoovagi (2006)
Kallattam (2016)
Kallipennu (1966)
Kalliyankattu Neeli (1979)
Kalloori (2007)
Kalloori Vaasal (1996)
Kallu (1988)
Kallu Kondoru Pennu (1998)
Kallu Sakkare (1967)
Kallukkul Eeram (1980)
Kallum Kaniyagum (1968)
Kalluveene Nudiyithu (1983)
Kalos ilthe to dollario (1967)
Kaloyan (1963)
Kalpana: (1948, 1960, 1970 & 2012)
Kalpana 2 (2016)
Kalyana Agathigal (1985)
Kalyana Galatta (1998)
Kalyana Kacheri (1997)
Kalyana Kalam (1982)
Kalyana Kurimanam (2005)
Kalyaanappanthal (1975)
Kalyanam (2018)
Kalyani: (1940, 1952, 1971 & 1979)
Kalyanikku Kalyanam (1959)
Kalyaniyin Kanavan (1963)
Kalyanji Anandji (1995)

Kam 

 Kam slunce nechodí (1971)
Kama Sutra: A Tale of Love (1997)
Kamaal Dhamaal Malamaal (2012)
Kamagni (1987)
Kamagong (1987)
Kambakht (TBD)
Kambakkht Ishq (2009)
Kambal Na Kamao: Madugong Engkwentro (1988)
Kambal Tuko (1988)
Kamachi (2004)
Kamadhenu (1941)
Kamagni (1987)
Kamakalawa (1981)
Kamala (2019)
Kamaladalam (1992)
Kamalatho Naa Prayanam (2013)
Kamali from Nadukkaveri (2021)
Kamalolmolk (1984)
Kamandag ng Droga (2017)
Kamara's Tree (2013)
Kamaraj (2004)
Kamarasu (2002)
Kamasutra 3D (2013)
Kamay ni Cain (1957)
Kambakht (TBD)
Kambakkht Ishq (2009)
Kambal Na Kamao: Madugong Engkwentro (1988)
Kambhoji (2017)
Kambili: The Whole 30 Yards (2020)
Kamchatka (2002)
Kameleon 2 (2005)
Kamen Rider series:
Kamen Rider ZO (1993)
Kamen Rider J (1994)
Kamen Rider World (1994)
Kamen Rider Ryuki: Episode Final (2002)
Kamen Rider 555: Paradise Lost (2003)
Kamen Rider Blade: Missing Ace (2004)
Kamen Rider Hibiki & The Seven Senki (2005)
Kamen Rider: The First (2005)
Kamen Rider Kabuto: God Speed Love (2006)
Kamen Rider Den-O: I'm Born! (2007)
Kamen Rider: The Next (2007)
Kamen Rider Den-O & Kiva: Climax Deka (2008)
Kamen Rider Kiva: King of the Castle in the Demon World (2008)
Saraba Kamen Rider Den-O: Final Countdown (2008)
Cho Kamen Rider Den-O & Decade Neo Generations: The Onigashima Warship (2009)
Kamen Rider Decade: All Riders vs. Dai-Shocker (2009)
Kamen Rider × Kamen Rider W & Decade: Movie War 2010 (2009)
Kamen Rider W Forever: A to Z/The Gaia Memories of Fate (2010)
Kamen Rider × Kamen Rider OOO & W Featuring Skull: Movie War Core (2010)
OOO, Den-O, All Riders: Let's Go Kamen Riders (2011)
Kamen Rider OOO Wonderful: The Shogun and the 21 Core Medals (2011)
Kamen Rider × Kamen Rider Fourze & OOO: Movie War Mega Max (2011)
Kamen Rider × Super Sentai: Super Hero Taisen (2012)
Kamen Rider Fourze the Movie: Space, Here We Come! (2012)
Kamen Rider × Kamen Rider Wizard & Fourze: Movie War Ultimatum (2012)
Kamen Rider × Super Sentai × Space Sheriff: Super Hero Taisen Z (2013)
Kamen Rider Wizard in Magic Land (2013)
Kamen Rider × Kamen Rider Gaim & Wizard: The Fateful Sengoku Movie Battle (2013)
Heisei Riders vs. Shōwa Riders: Kamen Rider Taisen feat. Super Sentai (2014)
Kamen Rider Gaim: Great Soccer Battle! Golden Fruits Cup! (2014)
Kamen Rider × Kamen Rider Drive & Gaim: Movie War Full Throttle (2014)
Super Hero Taisen GP: Kamen Rider 3 (2015)
Kamen Rider Drive: Surprise Future (2015)
Kamen Rider × Kamen Rider Ghost & Drive: Super Movie War Genesis (2015)
Kamen Rider 1 (2016)
Kamen Rider Ghost: The 100 Eyecons and Ghost's Fated Moment (2016)
Kamen Rider Heisei Generations Final: Build & Ex-Aid with Legend Rider (2017)
Kamen Rider Ex-Aid the Movie: True Ending (2017)
Kamen Rider Amazons the Movie: The Last Judgement (2018)
Kamen Rider Build the Movie: Be the One (2018)
Kamen Rider Heisei Generations Forever (2018)
Kamera Obskura (2012)
Kameradschaft (1931)
Kami: (1982 & 2008)
Kamihate Store (2012)
Kamikaze (1986)
Kamikaze 1989 (1982)
Kamikaze Man: Duel at Noon (1966)
Kamikaze Taxi (1995)
Kamikazen: Last Night in Milan (1987)
Kamilla and the Thief (1988)
Kamilla and the Thief II (1989)
Kamillions (1989)
Kaminey (2009)
Kamini (1974)
Kamisama no Karute (2011)
Kamisama no Karute 2 (2014)
Kamla (1984)
Kamla Ki Maut (1989)
Kamli: (2006 & 2022)
Kammara Sambhavam (2018)
Kammatipaadam (2016)
Kamome Shokudo (2006)
Kamouraska (1973)
Kampen mod uretten (1949)
Kampen om Næsbygård (1964)
Kampf um Norwegen – Feldzug 1940 (1940)
Kampf um Rom (1968–69)
Kamsale Kaisale (2012)
Kamsin: The Untouched (1997)
Kamui Gaiden (2009)
Kamuki (2018)
Kamulah Satu-Satunya (2007)
Kamyabi (1984)

Kan 

Kan du vissla Johanna? (1994 TV)
Kan Kanda Deivam (1967)
Kan Pesum Vaarthaigal (2013)
Kan Simittum Neram (1988)
Kan Thiranthathu (1959)
Kana Kandaen (2005)
Kana Kanmani (2009)
Kanaa (2018)
Kanagavel Kaaka (2010)
Kanaka (2018)
Kanaka Simhasanam (2007)
Kanakachilanga (1966)
Kanakambarangal (1988)
Kanakompathu (2011)
Kanal (2015)
Kanał (1956)
Kanalizasyon (2009)
Kanalkattakal (1978)
Kanalkkattu (1991)
Kanalukku Karaiyethu (1982)
Kanamachi (2013)
Kanamarayathu (1984)
Kanana Sundari (1988)
Kanasemba Kudureyaneri (2010)
Kanashii kibun de joke (1985)
Kanasina Rani (1992)
Kanasugara (2001)
Kanavan (1968)
Kanavan Manaivi (1976)
Kanavaney Kankanda Deivam (1955)
Kanave Kalaiyadhe (1999)
Kanavu (1954)
Kanavu Meippada Vendum (2004)
Kanavu Variyam (2017)
Kanavugal Karpanaigal (1982)
Kanchana (1952)
Kanchana 2 (2015)
Kanchana 3 (2019)
Kanchenjungha (1962)
Kancher Deyal (1963)
Kanchhi (1984)
KanColle: The Movie (2016)
Kandahar (2001)
Kan'du Ibilees (2018)
Kandukondain Kandukondain (2000)
Una Kang Naging Akin (1991)
Kangaroo: (1952, 1987, 2007 & 2015)
Kangaroo Jack (2003)
Kangaroo Jack: G'Day U.S.A.! (2004)
The Kangaroo Kid (1950)
Kangaroo Palace (1997) (TV)
Kangaroo: A Love Hate Story (2017)
Kanggeonneo maeul (1935)
Kannathil Muthamittal (2002)
The Kansan (1943)
Kansas (1988)
Kansas City (1996)
Kansas City Bomber (1972)
Kansas City Confidential (1952)
Kansas City Kitty (1944)
The Kansas City Massacre (1975 TV)
Kansas City Princess (1934)
Kansas Cyclone (1941)
Kansas Pacific (1953)
Kansas Raiders (1950)
Kansas Saloon Smashers (1901)
The Kansas Terrors (1939)
Kantara (2022)

Kao–Kap 

Kaos (1984)
Kapaemahu (2020)
Kapag Puno Na ang Salop (1987)
Kapag Tumibok Ang Puso: Not Once, But Twice (2006)
Kapalkundala (1933)
Kapantay ay Langit (1994)
Kapitäne bleiben an Bord (1959)
Kapitein Rob en het Geheim van Professor Lupardi (2007)
Kapo: (1960 & 2000)
Kapoor & Sons (2016)
Kappal (2014)
Kappal Muthalaali (2009)
Kappalottiya Thamizhan (1961)
Kappiri Thuruthu (2016)
Kappu Bilupu (1969)
Kaptaan (2016)
Kapurush (1965)
Kapus Kondyachi Goshta (2014)
Kaputt Mundi (1998)
Kapyong (2011)

Kar 

Kara Murat Şeyh Gaffar'a Karşı (1976)
Karaar (2017)
Karachi Lahore series:
Karachi Se Lahore (2015)
Lahore Se Aagey (2016)
Karado: The Kung Fu Flash (1973)
Karafuto 1945 Summer Hyosetsu no Mon (1974)
Karagattakaran (1989)
Karaikkal Ammaiyar: (1943 & 1973)
Karaiyellam Shenbagapoo (1981)
Karajan: The Maestro and His Festival (2017)
Karakanakadal (1971)
Karakolda Ayna Var (1966)
Karakum (1994)
Karam (2005)
Karam Dosa (2016)
Karama Has No Walls (2012)
Karamay (2010)
The Karamazovs (2008)
Karamoja (1954)
Karan Arjun (1995)
Karanji (2009)
Karaoke (2009)
Karaoke Crazies (2016)
The Karaoke King (2007)
Karar: The Deal (2014)
Karate (1983)
Karate Bearfighter (1975)
Karate Cop (1991)
The Karate Dog (2004 TV)
Karate Girl (2011)
The Karate Guard (2005)
Karate Kiba (1973)
The Karate Kid series:
The Karate Kid: (1984 & 2010)
The Karate Kid Part II (1986)
The Karate Kid Part III (1989)
The Next Karate Kid (1994)
The Karate Killers (1967)
Karate for Life (1977)
Karate Warrior (1987)
Karate Warriors (1976)
Karate-Robo Zaborgar (2011)
Karateci Kız (1973)
Karavan Lyubvi (1991 TV)
Karayilekku Oru Kadal Dooram (2010)
Karayuki-san, the Making of a Prostitute (1975)
Karbala (2015)
Kardec (2019)
Kardia (2006)
Kareeb (1998)
Karel Havlíček Borovský (1925)
Karel, Me and You (2019)
Karem the Possession (2021)
Karen (2021)
The Karen Carpenter Story (1989 TV)
Kargus (1981)
Karie (2015)
Karin Månsdotter (1954)
Karin's Face (1984)
Karina the Dancer (1928)
Karinkunnam 6's (2016)
Kariya (2003)
Kariya 2 (2017)
Kariyilakkattu Pole (1986)
Karl Liebknecht – Solange Leben in mir ist (1965)
Karl Liebknecht – Trotz alledem! (1972)
Karmic Mahjong (2006)
The Karnival Kid (1929)
Kart Racer (2003)
The Karthauzer (1916)
Karthikeya (2014)
Karthikeya 2 (2022)
Karu süda (2001)
Karujaht Pärnumaal (1914)
Karz (1980)

Kas 

Kasaba: (1997 & 2016)
Kasak: (1992 & 2005)
Kasal: (2014 & 2018)
Kasal, Kasali, Kasalo (2006)
Kasam: (1993 & 2001)
Kasam Paida Karne Wale Ki (1984)
Kasam Suhaag Ki (1989)
Kasam Vardi Ki (1989)
Kasarkode Khaderbai (1992)
Kasauti: (1941 & 1974)
Kasavuthattam (1967)
Kasba (1991)
Kasethan Kadavulada: (1972 & 2011)
Kash Aap Hamare Hote (2003)
Kashchey the Immortal (1945)
Kashmakash (1973)
Kashmeeram (1994)
Kashmir Daily (2017)
The Kashmir Files (2022)
Kashmir Ki Kali (1964)
Kashmora (1986)
Kasi (2001)
Kasi Yathirai (1973)
Kasidre Kailasa (1971)
Kasimedu Govindan (2008)
Kasme Vaade (1978)
Kasoor (2001)
Kassbach – Ein Porträt (1979)
Kassettenliebe (1981)
Kasthooriman (2003)
Kasthuri Maan (2005)
Kasturi (1980)
Kasturi Nivasa (1971)
Kasturi Thilakam (1970)
Kastus Kalinovskiy (1928)
Kasu Irukkanum (2007)
Kasum Khoon Ki (1977)

Kat 

Katakataala Rudraiah (1978)
Kataksha (2019)
Katala (1989)
Katalin Varga (2009)
Katamarayudu (2017)
Katanga Business (2009)
Katari Veera (1966)
Katari Veera Surasundarangi (2012)
Katariina ja Munkkiniemen kreivi (1943)
Katastrofa (1965)
Katasumi and 4444444444 (1998)
Kate (2021)
Kate – la bisbetica domata (2004)
Kate Bliss and the Ticker Tape Kid (1978 TV)
Kate & Leopold (2001)
The Kate Logan Affair (2010)
Kate Plus Ten (1938)
Kate's Secret (1986 TV)
Katerina Izmailova (1966)
Katha: (1983 & 2009)
Katha Deithili Maa Ku (2004)
Katha Dilam (1991)
Katha Ithuvare (1985)
Katha Karana Heena (2019)
Katha Kathmandu (2018)
Kathanayakudu (1969)
Katia (1938)
Katie Tippel (1975)
Katmandú, un espejo en el cielo (2010)
The Katnips of 1940 (1934)
Katutu, the Blind (1953)
Katy Perry: Part of Me (2012)
Katyń (2007)
Katze im Sack (2005)
Katzelmacher (1969)
Katzgraben (1957)
Katzhen (2005)

Kau–Kav 

Kauda Bole Alice (2000)
Kauda Machan Alice (2014)
Kauf dir einen bunten Luftballon (1961)
Kaum De Heere (2014)
Kaun (1999)
Kaun Apna Kaun Paraya (1963)
Kaun Hai Jo Sapno Mein Aaya (2004)
Kaun Jeeta Kaun Haara (1987)
Kaun Kare Insaaf (2015)
Kaun Kare Kurbanie (1991)
Kaun Kitne Paani Mein (2015)
Kaun Rokega Mujhe (1997)
Kaun Sachcha Kaun Jhootha (1997)
Kausthubham (2010)
The Kautokeino Rebellion (2008)
Käuzchenkuhle (1968)
Kavacha (2019)
Kavacham: (1992 & 2018)
Kavadiyattam (1993)
Kavalai Illaadha Manithan (1960)
Kavalai Padathe Sagodhara (1998)
Kavalai Vendam (2016)
Kavalam Chundan (1967)
Kavalan Avan Kovalan (1987)
Kavaleredu Kulavandu (1964)
Kavalukku Kettikaran (1990)
Kavan (2017)
Kaveri: (1955, 1975 & 1986)
Kavi Uddheshichathu..? (2016)
Kaviyam (1994)
Kavya (1995)
Kavya's Diary (2009)

Kaw–Kaz 

Kaw (2007)
Kawa (2010)
Kawasaki's Rose (2009)
Kawashima Yoshiko (1990)
Kay Tagal Kang Hinitay (1998)
Kaya (1967)
Kayal (2014)
Kayalkkarayil (1968)
Kayalum Kayarum (1979)
Kayam: (1982 & 2011)
Kayamkulam Kochunni: (1966 & 2018)
Kayan Beauties (2012)
Kayda Kanoon (1993)
Kaydyacha Bola (2005)
Kazaam (1996)
Kazablan (1974)
Kazan (1921)
Kazar (2009)
Każdemu wolno kochać (1933)
Kaze, Ghost Warrior (2004)
Kaze, Slow Down (1991)
Kaze ni Tatsu Lion (2015)
Kazhakam (1996)
Kazhugu: (1981 & 2012)
Kazhugu 2 (2019)
Kazhugumalai Kallan (1988)
Kazhukan (1979)
Kazhumaram (1982)
Kazimierz Wielki (1975)
Kazoku (1970)

Kd 

Kdybych byl tátou (1939)
Když rozvod, tak rozvod (1982)
Když struny lkají (1930)

Ke 

Ke Tumi (2008)

Kea–Kee 

Kean: (1921, 1924 & 1940)
Kean: Genius or Scoundrel (1956)
Keane (2005)
Keane of Kalgoorlie (1911)
Keanu (2016)
Keaton's Cop (1990)
Keats and His Nightingale: A Blind Date (1985)
Kebab Connection (2005)
Kebabaluba (1995)
Kebe Tume Nahan Kebe Mu Nahin (2012)
Kedarnath (2018)
Kedi: (2006, 2010 & 2016)
Kedi Billa Killadi Ranga (2013)
Kedma (2002)
Kedok Ketawa (1940)
Kee (2019)
Kee en Janus naar Berlijn (1923)
Kee en Janus naar Parijs (1924)
Keechaka Vadham (c. 1917)
Keelu Bommalu (1965)
Keelu Gurram (1949)
Keemat: (1946 & 1973)
Keemat – They Are Back (1998)
Keen as Mustard (1989)
The Keep (1983)
Keep 'Em Flying (1941)
Keep 'Em Rolling (1934)
Keep 'Em Slugging (1943)
Keep Away from the Window (2000)
Keep Calm and Be a Superstar (2018)
Keep Cool (1997)
Keep an Eye Out (2018)
Keep Fit (1937)
Keep It in the Family (1973)
Keep It Up, Jack (1973)
Keep Laughing (1932)
Keep Not Silent (2002)
Keep Quiet (2016)
Keeper (2015)
The Keeper: (1976, 2004, 2009 & 2018)
The Keeper: The Legend of Omar Khayyam (2005)
The Keeper of the Bees: (1925 & 1935)
Keeper of Darkness (2015)
The Keeper of Lost Causes (2013)
Keeper of Promises (1962)
Keeping the Faith (2000)
The Keeping Hours (2017)
Keeping Mum (2005)
Keeping the Promise (1997 TV)
The Keeping Room (2014)
Keerthi Chakra (2006)
Keetje Tippel (1975)

Keh–Kem 

Kehtaa Hai Dil Baar Baar (2002)
Keiko (1979)
Keiko: The Untold Story (2010)
Kein Mann zum Heiraten (1959)
Keiron: The First Voyager (1995)
Keisatsu Nikki (1955)
Keïta! l'Héritage du griot (1995)
Keith (2008)
Keith Lemon: The Film (2012)
Kekec (1951)
Kekec's Tricks (1968)
Kekexili: Mountain Patrol (2004)
Kékszakállú (2016)
Keladi Kanmani (1990)
Keli (1991)
Kelkkaatha Sabdham (1982)
Kelly (1981 TV)
Kelly & Cal (2014)
The Kelly Gang (1920)
Kelly and Me (1957)
Kelly the Second (1936)
Kelly of the Secret Service (1936)
Kelly + Victor (2012)
Kelly's Heroes (1970)
The Kellys of Tobruk (unreleased)
Kelor Kirti (2016)
Kelviyum Naane Pathilum Naane (1982)
Kempe Gowda (2011)
Kemper: The CoEd Killer (2008)

Ken–Kep 

Ken (1964)
Ken Park (2002)
Kencho Khunrte Keute (1995)
Kencho Khurte Keute (2014)
Kène ya ma kène... (2010)
Keni (1982)
Kenji Comes Home (1949)
Kenji Mizoguchi: The Life of a Film Director (1975)
The Kennel Murder Case (1933)
Kenner (1969)
Kenny: (1988 & 2006)
Kenny & Company (1976)
Kenpei to Barabara Shibijin (1957)
Kenpei to Yurei (1958)
The Kentuckian (1955)
The Kentuckians (1921)
Kentucky (1938)
Kentucky Blue Streak (1935)
Kentucky Days (1923)
The Kentucky Derby (1922)
The Kentucky Fried Movie (1977)
Kentucky Handicap (1926)
Kentucky Jubilee (1951)
Kentucky Kernels (1934)
Kentucky Minstrels (1934)
Kentucky Moonshine (1938)
Kentucky Pride (1925)
Kentucky Rifle (1955)
Kentucky Woman (1983 TV)
Keo Pneik Somnob Jet (2008)
Keoma (1976)
Kept and Dreamless (2005)
Kept Husbands (1931)
Kept Man (2014)

Ker–Key 

Kerala House Udan Vilpanakku (2004)
Kerala Kesari (1951)
Kerala Varma Pazhassi Raja (2009)
Keralida Simha (1981)
Keralotsavam 2009 (2009)
Kerd ma lui (2004)
Kereta Hantu Manggarai (2008)
Kerim, Son of the Sheik (1962)
The Kerry Gow (1912)
Kes (1969)
Kesari (2019)
Kesarina Kamala (1973)
Keshava (2017)
Keshin (1986)
The Ketchup Effect (2004)
Keto and Kote (1948)
Kettévált mennyezet (1981)
Ketti Melam (1985)
Kettle of Fish (2006)
The Kettles in the Ozarks (1956)
The Kettles on Old MacDonald's Farm (1957)
Kevade (1969)
Kevi Rite Jaish (2012)
Kevin of the North (2001)
Kevin & Perry Go Large (2000)
Kevvu Keka (2013)
Key (2011)
The Key: (1934, 1958, 1961, 1965, 1971, 1983, 2007 & 2014)
Key to the City (1950)
Key Exchange (1985)
Key to Harmony (1935)
Key Largo (1948)
Key of Life (2012)
The Key Man: (1957 & 2011)
The Key to Paradise (1970)
The Key to Reserva (2007)
Key West (1973)
Key Witness: (1947 & 1960)
The Key of the World (1918)
Keyamat Theke Keyamat (1993)
Keye Luke (2012)
Keyhole (2012)
The Keyhole (1933)
Keys to the Heart (2018)
The Keys to the House (2004)
The Keys of the Kingdom (1944)
Keys to Tulsa (1997)
Keystone Hotel (1935)

Kh

Kha 

Khaad (2014)
Khaan Dost (1976)
Khabardar (2006)
Khaddama (2011)
Khadeeja (1967)
Khadeema Kallaru (1982)
Khadgam (2002)
Khaidi: (1983 & 1984)
Khaidi Kannaiah (1962)
Khaidi No. 150 (2017)
Khaidi No. 786 (1988)
Khajoor Pe Atke (2018)
Khal-Naaikaa (1993)
Khaled (2001)
Khalifa (1976)
Khalifah (2011)
Khamma Mara Veera (1976)
Khamosh (1985)
Khamosh Nigahen: (1946 & 1986)
Khamosh Pani (2003)
Khamosh Raho (2011)
Khamoshh... Khauff Ki Raat (2005)
Khamoshi: (1970 & 2019)
Khamoshi: The Musical (1996)
Khamoshiyan (2015)
Khamsa (2008)
Khan Bahadur (1937)
Khan Kluay (2006)
Khan Kluay 2 (2009)
Khana Baraha (1981)
Khandaan (1979)
Khandan: (1942 & 1965)
Khandavideko Mamsavideko (1979)
Khandhar (1984)
Khangri: The Mountain (1996)
Khanjar (1980)
Khao Chon Kai (2006)
Khap (2011)
Khara Kadhi Bolu Naye (1987)
Kharms (2017)
Khartoum (1966)
Khatra (1991)
Khatron Ke Khiladi: (1988 & 2001)
Khasi Katha– A Goat Saga (2013)
Khatta Meetha: (1978 & 2010)
Khauff (2000)
Khazana (1987)
Khazanchi: (1941 & 1958)
Khazanchi Ki Beti (1943)

Khe–Kho 

Khel (1992)
Khel Khel Mein (1975)
Khel Khilari Ka (1977)
Khel Mandala (2012)
Khel Mohabbat Ka (1986)
Khel – No Ordinary Game (2003)
Khel Toh Ab Shuru Hoga (2016)
Khela (2008)
Khelein Hum Jee Jaan Sey (2010)
Khichdi: The Movie (2010)
Khilaaf (1991)
Khiladi: (1968, 1992, 2013 & 2016)
Khiladi 420 (2000)
Khiladi 786 (2012)
Khiladiyon Ka Khiladi (1996)
Khilona: (1942 & 1970)
Khodar Pore Ma (2012)
Khoey Ho Tum Kahan (2001)
Khoj: (1971, 1989 & 2017)
Khoj: The Search (2010)
Khoka 420 (2013)
Khokababu (2012)
Khokababur Pratyabartan (1960)
Khola Hawa (2014)
Khoobsurat: (1999 & 2014)
Khoon Aur Paani (1981)
Khoon Bhari Maang (1988)
Khoon Ka Badla Khoon (1978)
Khoon Ka Karz (1991)
Khoon Ka Khoon (1935)
Khoon Ka Rishta (1981)
Khoon Khoon (1973)
Khooni (1946)
Khooni Bistar (2002)
Khooni Darinda (1987)
Khooni Ilaaka:The Prohibited Area (1999)
Khooni Katar (1931)
Khooni Khanjar (1930)
Khooni Laash (1943)
Khooni Murda (1989)
Khooni Panja (1991)
Khooni Raat (1991)
Khooni Shikanja (2000)
Khooni Tantrik (2001)
Khoonkar Darinde (1999)
Khopdi: The Skull (1999)
Khosla Ka Ghosla (2006)
Khouya (2010)
Khovanshchina (1959)
Khoya Khoya Chand (2007)

Khr–Khy 

Khrustalyov, My Car! (1998)
Khubsoorat (1980)
Khuda Gawah (1992)
Khuda Kasam: (1981 & 2010)
Khuda Kay Liye (2007)
Khuddar: (1985 & 1994)
Khudgarz (1987)
Khulay Aasman Ke Neechay (2008)
Khuli Khidki (1989)
Khullam Khulla Pyaar Karen (2005)
Khulood (1948)
Khurafat: Perjanjian Syaitan (2011)
Khush (1991)
Khush Naseeb (1946)
Khushboo: (1975 & 2008)
Khushi: (2003 Hindi & 2003 Kannada)
Khushi Khushiyagi (2015)
Khwaabb (2014)
Khyanikaa: The Lost Idea (2017)

Ki 

Ki Jadu Korila (2008)
Ki Je Kori (1976)
Ki & Ka (2016)
Ki Kore Bojhabo Tomake (2012)
Ki Kore Toke Bolbo (2016)

Kib–Kic 

Kiangnan 1894 (2019)
Kibbutz (2005)
Kibera Kid (2006)
The Kibitzer (1930)
Kiccha (2003)
Kiccha Huccha (2010)
Kicha Vayasu 16 (2005)
Kichhhu Sanlap Kichhu Pralap (1999)
Kichiku Dai Enkai (1997)
Kick: (1999, 2009 & 2014)
Kick 2 (2015)
The Kick (2011)
Kick-Ass series:
Kick-Ass (2010)
Kick-Ass 2 (2013)
Kick Ball (2015)
Kick-Heart (2013)
Kick In: (1917, 1922 & 1931)
Kick in Iran (2010)
Kick Me (1975)
Kick the Moon (2001)
Kickaroo (1921)
The Kickback (1922)
Kickboxer series:
Kickboxer (1989)
Kickboxer 2 (1991)
Kickboxer 3 (1992)
Kickboxer 4 (1994)
Kickboxer 5 (1995)
Kickboxer: Vengeance (2016)
Kickboxer: Retaliation (2018)
Kickboxing Academy (1997)
Kicked in the Head (1997)
Kicked Out (1918)
Kickin' the Crown Around (1933)
Kickin' It Old Skool (2007)
Kicking the Germ Out of Germany (1918)
Kicking It (2008)
Kicking the Moon Around (1938)
Kicking Out Shoshana (2014)
Kicking and Screaming: (1995 & 2005)
Kicks (2016)

Kid 

Kid: (1990 & 2012)
A Kid (2016)
The Kid: (1910, 1921, 1950, 1999, 2000, 2010 & 2019)
The Kid with the 200 I.Q. (1983)
Kid Auto Races at Venice (1914)
The Kid from the Big Apple (2016)
The Kid with a Bike (2011)
Kid Blue (1973)
Kid Boots (1926)
The Kid from Borneo (1933)
The Kid from Broken Gun (1952)
The Kid with the Broken Halo (1982)
The Kid from Brooklyn (1946)
The Kid Brother (1927)
Kid Candidate (2021)
Kid Cannabis (2014)
The Kid from Cleveland (1949)
The Kid Comes Back (1938)
Kid Cop (1993)
The Kid and the Cowboy (1919)
The Kid Detective (2020)
Kid Dynamite (1943)
Kid Galahad: (1937 & 1962)
Kid Gang on the Go (1971)
Kid Glove Killer (1942)
Kid Gloves (1929)
Kid with the Golden Arm (1979)
The Kid & I (2005)
The Kid from Kansas (1941)
A Kid in King Arthur's Court (1995)
A Kid in Aladdin's Palace (1997)
The Kid from Kokomo (1939)
Kid Kulafu (2015)
The Kid from Left Field: (1953 & 1979)
Kid Millions (1934)
Kid Monk Baroni (1952)
Kid Nightingale (1939)
The Kid Rides Again (1943)
Kid Rodelo (1966)
Kid Safe: The Video (1988)
The Kid Sister (1945)
The Kid from Spain (1932)
Kid Speed (1924)
The Kid Stakes (1927)
The Kid Stays in the Picture (2002)
The Kid from Texas: (1939 & 1950)
A Kid for Two Farthings (1955)
The Kid Who Couldn't Miss (1983)
The Kid Who Would Be King (2019)
Kida Poosari Magudi (2016)
Kidaari (2016)
Kidappadam (1955)
Kidco (1984)
Kidder & Ko (1918)
Kiddie Kure (1940)
Kiddie League (1959)
The Kiddies in the Ruins (1918)
Kidi (2017)
Kidnap: (1974, 2008, 2017 & 2019)
Kidnap Capital (2015)
Kidnap Syndicate (1975)
Kidnapped: (1917, 1935, 1938, 1948, 1960, 1971,  1974, 1986, 1995 TV, 2010) & Kidnapped (2021)
The Kidnapped Bride (1914)
Kidnapped in New York (1914)
Kidnapped to Mystery Island (1964)
The Kidnapper (1958)
The Kidnappers (1953)
Kidnapping Freddy Heineken (2015)
Kidnapping the Kid (1914)
The Kidnapping of Lola (1986)
The Kidnapping of Michel Houellebecq (2014)
The Kidnapping of the President (1980)
Kidnapping Stella (2019)
Kidnapping, Caucasian Style (1967)
Kidnapping, Caucasian Style! (2014)
Kids (1995)
The Kids (2015)
Kids in America (2005)
Kids + Money (2008)
Kids World (2001)
The Kids Are All Right (2010)
The Kids Are Alright (1979)
The Kid's Clever (1929)
The Kids Grow Up: (1942 & 1976)
The Kids from the Marx and Engels Street (2014)
The Kids Menu (2016)
The Kids from the Port (2013)
Kids of the Round Table (1995)
The Kids in the Shoe (1935)
Kidulthood (2006)

Kie–Kik 

Kie Kahara (1968)
Kif Tebbi (1928)
Kika (1993)
Kikaider Reboot (2014)
Kikansha Sensei (2004)
Kiki: (1926, 1931, 1932 & 2016)
Kiki, Love to Love (2016)
Kiki's Delivery Service: (1989 & 2014)
Kiko Foils the Fox (1936)
Kiko and the Honey Bears (1936)
Kikoku (2003)
Kikoriki. Team Invincible (2011)
Kikos: (1931 & 1979)
Kiku to Isamu (1959)
Kikujiro (2000)

Kil–Kim 

Kill Bill: Volume 1 (2003)
Kill Bill: Volume 2 (2004)
Kill a Dragon (1967)
Kill the Irishman (2011)
Kill List (2011)
Kill the Man (1999)
Kill Me Again (1989)
Kill Me Later (2001)
Kill Me Three Times (2016)
Kill the Poor (2006)
Kill Switch: (2008 & 2017)
Kill Them All and Come Back Alone (1968)
Kill Time (2016)
Kill the Umpire (1950)
Kill Your Darlings: (2006 & 2013)
Kill! (1968)
Kill, Baby, Kill (1968)
Killer: (1991 & 1998)
The Killer: (1953, 1972, 1989, 2006 & 2017)
A Killer Among Us (1990 TV)
Killer Bash (2005)
Killer Condom (1996)
Killer Diller: (1948 & 2004)
The Killer Elite (1975)
Killer Elite (2011)
The Killer Inside Me: (1976 & 2010)
Killer Instinct: (1988 TV & 1992)
Killer Joe (2011)
Killer Klowns from Outer Space (1988)
Killer Meteors (1976)
Killer Nun (1978)
The Killer Reserved Nine Seats (1974)
Killer of Sheep (1978)
The Killer Shrews (1959)
Killer Sofa (2019)
Killer Tattoo (2001)
Killer: A Journal of Murder (1996)
 The Killer Within (2006)
Killer's Kiss (1955)
Killer's Moon (1978)
Killers: (2000 TV, 2003, 2010 & 2014)
The Killers: (1946, 1956 & 1964)
Killers of the Flower Moon (2022)
Killers in the House (1998 TV)
Killers from Space (1954)
Killers Three (1968)
Killing (2018)
The Killing (1956)
Killing Car (1993)
The Killing of a Chinese Bookie (1976)
The Killing Fields (1984)
The Killing Gene (2007)
The Killing Jar (2010)
Killing Me Softly (2002)
Killing Mr. Griffin (1997)
The Killing Room (2009)
The Killing of a Sacred Deer (2017)
Killing Season (2013)
The Killing of Sister George (1968)
Killing Them Softly (2012)
Killing Zoe (1994)
KillRoy Was Here (2022)
Killshot (2009)
Kim: (1950 & 1984)
Kim Possible series:
Kim Possible (2019 TV)
Kim Possible: A Sitch in Time (2003 TV)
Kim Possible Movie: So the Drama (2005 TV)
Kimi (2022)
Kimi ni Todoke (2010)
Kimjongilia (2009)
Kimmy Dora series:
Kimmy Dora: Kambal sa Kiyeme (2009)
Kimmy Dora and the Temple of Kiyeme (2012)
Kimmy Dora: Ang Kiyemeng Prequel (2013)
Kimo and his Buddy (2004)
Kimurake no Hitobito (1988)

Kin 

Kin (2018)
Kin-dza-dza! (1986)
Kin Fables (2013–2015) Canadian film project including three short films
Kinamand (2005)
Kinatay (2009)
Kinavalli (2018)
Kind Hearts and Coronets (1949)
A Kind of Loving (1962)
Kindergarten: (1983 & 1989)
Kindergarten Cop (1990)
Kindergarten Cop 2 (2016)
Kindling (1915)
Kindred (2020)
The Kindred (1987)
Kinetta (2005)
King: (2002 & 2008)
The King: (1936, 1995, 2002, 2005, 2007, 2017 Korean, 2017 American & 2019)
The King – Jari Litmanen (2012)
King of the Ants (2003)
King Arthur (2004)
King Arthur Was a Gentleman (1942)
King Arthur: Legend of the Sword (2017)
King Boxer (1972)
King of California (2007)
King of the Children (1987)
King of Chinatown (1939)
The King and the Clown (2005)
King Cobra: (1999 & 2016)
King of Comedy (1999)
The King of Comedy (1983)
King and Country (1964)
King Creole (1958)
King David (1985)
King for a Day: (1940 & 1983)
The King and Four Queens (1956)
King of Hearts: (1936, 1966 & 1968)
King of the Hill (1993)
The King and I: (1956 & 1999)
The King of Kings: (1927 & 1963)
King of Kings (1961)
King Knight (2021)
King Kong: (1933, 1976 & 2005)
King Kong Escapes (1968)
King Kong vs. Godzilla (1962)
King Kong Lives (1986)
The King of Kong: A Fistful of Quarters (2007)
The King of Marvin Gardens (1972)
The King of Masks (1996)
The King and the Mockingbird (1980)
King of the Mountain (1981)
The King of the Mountain (2007)
A King in New York (1957)
King of New York (1990)
King Ralph (1991)
King Richard (2021)
King Richard and the Crusaders (1954)
King Solomon's Mines: (1937, 1950, 1985 & 2004 TV)
The King of Staten Island (2020)
King of the Zombies (1941)
King: A Filmed Record... Montgomery to Memphis (1970)
The King's Daughter: (1916 & 2022)
The King's Man (2021)
King's Ransom (2005)
The King's Speech (2010)
A King's Story (1965)
The Kingdom (2007)
The Kingdom and the Beauty (1959)
Kingdom Come: (1919 & 2001)
The Kingdom of the Fairies (1903)
Kingdom of Heaven (2005)
Kingdom of the Planet of the Apes (2024)
Kingdom of the Spiders (1977)
Kingpin: (1985 & 1996)
Kings: (2007 & 2017)
Kings of the Road (1976)
Kings Row (1942)
The Kings of Summer (2013)
Kings of the Sun (1963)
Kingsglaive: Final Fantasy XV (2016)
Kingsman series:
Kingsman: The Secret Service (2014)
Kingsman: The Golden Circle (2017)
Kingsman: The Blue Blood (2023)
Kini and Adams (1997)
Kinjite: Forbidden Subjects (1989)
Kinky Boots (2005)
Kinsey (2004)
Kinski Paganini (1989)

Kip–Kir 

Kipps: (1921 & 1941)
Kippur (2000)
Kira Kiralina (2014)
Kira's Reason: A Love Story (2001)
Kiraatham (1985)
Kiragoorina Gayyaligalu (2016)
Kirai Dada (1987)
Kirataka (2011)
Kiratha Arjuna (1940)
Kirathakudu (1986)
Kirayi Rowdylu (1981)
Kireedam: (1989 & 2007)
Kireedamillatha Rajakkanmar (1996)
Kiri no Hata (1965)
Le Kiri Kandulu (2003)
Kirik Party (2016)
Kirikou and the Men and Women (2012)
Kirikou et les bêtes sauvages (2005)
Kirikou and the Sorceress (1998)
The Kirishima Thing (2012)
Kiriti O Kalo Bhromor (2016)
Kiriti Roy (2016)
Kirpaan: The Sword of Honour (2014)
Kirpi (2009)
Kirrak Party (2018)

Kis 

Kisan (2006)
Kisan Aur Bhagwan (1974)
Kisan Kanya (1937)
Kisapmata (1981)
Kisaragi (2007)
Kishen Kanhaiya (1990)
Kishibe-chou Kidan: Tanbou-hen (2012)
Kishore Kumar Junior (2018)
Kisise Na Kehna (1942)
Kiski Biwi (1942)
Kismat Ka Dhani (1946)
Kismat Ki Baazi (1980)
Kismat Konnection (2008)
Kismat Love Paisa Dilli (2012)
Kismet: How Turkish Soap Operas Changed the World (2014)
Kismet Ka Khel (1956)
Kismetwala (1986)
Kisna: The Warrior Poet (2005)
The Kiss: (1896, 1914, 1921, 1929, 1958, 1988, 2003, 2004 & 2007)
A Kiss Before Dying: (1956 & 1991)
The Kiss Before the Mirror (1933)
Kiss the Blood Off My Hands (1948)
Kiss the Bride: (2002 & 2008)
Kiss of the Damned (2012)
Kiss of Death: (1947 & 1995)
Kiss of the Dragon (2001)
The Kiss of Evil (2011)
Kiss the Girls (1997)
Kiss Kiss (Bang Bang) (2000)
Kiss Kiss Bang Bang (2005)
Kiss Me Deadly (1955)
Kiss Me Goodbye (1982)
Kiss Me Kate (1953)
Kiss Me, Guido (1997)
Kiss Me, Stupid (1964)
A Kiss on the Nose (2004)
Kiss the Sky (1999)
Kiss of the Spider Woman (1985)
Kiss Tomorrow Goodbye (1950)
Kiss of the Vampire (1963)
Kissa Kursi Ka (1977)
Kisse Pyaar Karoon (2009)
Kissebaaz (2019)
Kissed: (1922 & 1996)
Kissin' Cousins (1964)
Kissing a Fool (1998)
Kissing Jessica Stein (2001)
Kissinger and Nixon (1995 TV)

Kit–Kiz 

Kit Carson: (1903, 1928 & 1940)
Kit Kittredge: An American Girl (2008)
Kita Kita (2017)
Kitaab (1977)
Kitchen: (1966 & 1997)
The Kitchen: (1961, 2012 & 2019)
Kitchen Party (1997)
Kitchen Stories (2003)
Kitchen. The Last Battle (2017)
Kite: (1999 & 2014)
Kite Liberator (2008)
The Kite Runner (2007)
Kites (2010)
The Kites Flying in the Sky (2008)
Kites Grounded (TBD)
Kithakithalu (2006)
Kitne Door Kitne Paas (2002)
Kitten with a Whip (1964)
Kittu (2006)
Kittu Puttu (1977)
Kittu Unnadu Jagratha (2017)
Kittur Chenamma (1961)
Kitturiaq (2013)
Kitturina Huli (1991)
Kitty: (1929, 1945, 2002 & 2016)
Kitty and the Bagman (1983)
Kitty at Boarding School (1912)
Kitty Foyle (1940)
Kitty and the Great Big World (1956)
Kitty from Kansas City (1931)
Kitty Kelly, M.D. (1919)
Kitty Kornered (1946)
Kitty and the World Conference (1939)
Kivitoo: What They Thought of Us (2018)
Kiwani: The Movie (2008)
Kiwi! (2006)
Kiwwada Nahi Nokiwwada Nahi (2011)
Kizhakkan Pathrose (1992)
Kizhakke Pogum Rail (1978)
Kizhakke Varum Paattu (1993)
Kizhakku Africavil Sheela (1987)
Kizhakku Cheemayile (1993)
Kizhakku Kadalkarai Salai (2006)
Kizhakku Karai (1991)
Kizhakku Mugam (1996)
Kizhakku Vasal (1990)
Kizhakkum Merkkum (1998)
Kizhakkunarum Pakshi (1991)
Kizudarake no Akuma (2017)
Kizumonogatari Part 1: Tekketsu (2016)
Kizumonogatari II: Nekketsu-hen (2016)
Kizumonogatari Part 3: Reiketsu (2017)

Kk–Kl 

Kkoli: A Journey of Love (2014)
Klamek ji bo Beko (1992)
Klann – grand guignol (1969)
The Klansman (1974)
Klanta Aparahna (1985)
Klapzubova jedenáctka (1938)
Klass (2007)
Klassfesten (2002)
Klassiki periptosi vlavis (1987)
Klassikokkutulek (2016)
Klatretøsen (2002)
Klaus (2019)
Kleine Freiheit (2003)
Kleine Scheidegg (1937)
Kleinhoff Hotel (1977)
Kleinruppin forever (2004)
Klepto (2003)
Kleren Maken de Man (1957)
Klettermaxe: (1927 & 1952)
Klezmer (2015)
Klimt (2006)
Klingende toner (1945)
Klondike (1932)
Klondike Annie (1936)
Klondike Fever (1980)
Klondike Fury (1942)
Klondike Kate (1943)
Klopka (2007)
Klotz am Bein (1958)
Klown (2010)
Klown Forever (2015)
Klown Kamp Massacre (2010)
Klunkerz: A Film About Mountain Bikes (2006)
Klute (1971)

Kn

Kna–Kni 

The Knack ...and How to Get It (1965)
Knall and Fall as Detectives (1953)
Knall and Fall as Imposters (1952)
Knave of Hearts (1954)
The Knave of Hearts (1919)
The Kneeling Goddess (1947)
Knhom Jea Neakna (2009 TV)
Knick Knack (1989)
Knickerbocker Holiday (1944)
The Knife (1961)
Knife Edge (2009)
Knife Fight (2012)
Knife in the Head (1978)
Knife for the Ladies (1974)
The Knife of the Party (1934)
Knife Skills (2017)
The Knife That Killed Me (2014)
Knife in the Water (1962)
Knight of 100 Faces (1960)
The Knight of the Black Sword (1956)
A Knight in Camelot (1998)
Knight Club (2001)
Knight of Cups (2015)
Knight and Day (2010)
The Knight of the Dragon (1985)
The Knight Errant (1922)
Knight Moves (1992)
Knight Rider (2008) (TV)
Knight Rider 2000 (1991) (TV)
Knight Rider 2010 (1994) (TV)
The Knight of San Marco (1939)
The Knight of Shadows: Between Yin and Yang (2019)
The Knight of the Snows (1912)
Knight of the Trail (1915)
Knight Without Armour (1937)
Knight Without a Country (1959)
A Knight's Tale (2001)
Knightquest (2001)
Knightriders (1981)
Knights (1993)
Knights of the City (1986)
Knights for a Day (1937)
Knights of the Desert (1942)
Knights of Justice (2000 TV)
Knights Must Fall (1949)
The Knights of the Quest (2001)
Knights of the Round Table (1953)
Knights of the South Bronx (2005) (TV)
Knights of the Teutonic Order (1960)
Knighty Knight Bugs (1958)
Knitting (2008)
The Knitting (2012)
The Knitting Needles (1916)
Knives Out (2019)

Kno–Knu 

Knock on Any Door (1949)
Knock at the Cabin (2023)
Knock Down the House (2019)
Knock 'Em Dead, Kid (2009)
Knock Knock: (1940 & 2015)
Knock Knock, It's Tig Notaro (2015)
Knock Off (1998)
Knock Out (2010)
Knock on Wood: (1954 & 1981)
Knockabout (1979)
Knockaround Guys (2002)
Knocked Up (2007)
Knockin' on Heaven's Door (1997)
Knocking: (2006 & 2021)
Knocking on Death's Door (1999)
Knocking on Heaven's Door (2014)
Knockout: (1935, 1941, 2001 & 2011)
The Knockout: (1914, 1923 & 1925)
The Knockout Kid (1925)
Knockout Reilly (1927)
Knocks at My Door (1994)
The Knot: (1921 & 2006)
Knots (2005 TV)
Know Thy Child (1921)
Know Thy Wife (1918)
Know Your Ally: Britain (1944)
Know Your Enemy: Japan (1945)
Know Your History: Jesus Is Black; So Was Cleopatra (2007)
Know Your Men (1921)
Know Your Mushrooms (2008)
Knowing (2009)
Knowing Men (1930)
The Knowledge (1979)
Known Strangers (2010)
Knuckle (2011)
Knuckleball! (2012)
Knucklebones (1971)
Knucklehead: (2010 & 2015)
Knute Rockne, All American (1940)
Knutzy Knights (1954)

Ko 

Ko (2011)
Ko 2 (2016)
Ko Antey Koti (2012)
Ko Bongisa Mutu (2002)
Ko Ko (2012)
Ko Mark No Mark (2014)
Ko Tint Toh Super Yat Kwat (2014)
Ko Yal Toe Yal Soe Soe Yal (1967)

Koa–Kod 

Koala Kid (2012)
Kobarweng or Where is Your Helicopter? (1992)
Kobbari Bondam (1991)
Kobbari Matta (2018)
Kobe Doin' Work (2009 TV)
Kobiety nad przepaścią (1938)
Koch (2012)
Koch Brothers Exposed (2012)
Kochadaiiyaan (2014)
Kochaj albo rzuć (1977)
Kochaj tylko mnie (1935)
Kochaniyan (1994)
Kochaniyathi (1971)
Kochavva Paulo Ayyappa Coelho (2016)
Kochi Rajavu (2005)
Kochu Kochu Santhoshangal (2000)
Kochu Kochu Thettukal (1980)
Kochu Thampuratti (1979)
Kochu Themmadi (1986)
Kochumon (1965)
Kod Adı: K.O.Z. (2015)
Kodachrome (2017)
Kōdai-ke no Hitobito (2016)
Kodaikanal (2008)
Kodakara Sodo (1935)
Kodalu Diddina Kapuram (1970)
Kodambakkam (2006)
Kodanda Rama (2002)
Kodanda Ramudu (2000)
Kodathi Samaksham Balan Vakeel (2019)
Kodathy (1984)
Kodi (2016)
Kodi Parakuthu (1988)
Kodigo Penal: The Valderrama Case (1980)
Koditta Idangalai Nirappuga (2017)
Kodiveeran (2017)
Kodiyettam (1978)
Koduku Diddina Kapuram (1989)
Koduku Kodalu (1972)
Kodumudikal (1981)
Kodungallooramma (1968)
Koduthu Vaithaval (1963)

Koe–Kok 

Koenigsmark: (1923, 1935 & 1953)
Koeputkiaikuinen ja Simon enkelit (1979)
Kofuku (1981)
Kohinoor: (1960 & 2015)
Kohlhiesel's Daughters: (1930 & 1962)
Kohlhiesels Töchter (1920)
Kohta 18 (2012)
Kohtalon kirja (2003)
Koi Aap Sa (2005)
Koi Jeeta Koi Haara (1976)
Koi Kisise Kum Nahin (1997)
Koi Mere Dil Mein Hai (2005)
Koi Mere Dil Se Poochhe (2002)
Koi... Mil Gaya (2003)
Koi Sugata Kitsune Goten (1956)
Koi Tujh Sa Kahaan (2005)
Koisuru Onnatachi (1986)
Koisuru Vampire (2015)
Koizora (2007)
Kojak: The Price of Justice (1987)
Kokey (1997)
Kokila: (1937, 1977 & 1990)
Kokilamma (1983)
Kokki (2006)
Kokkuri-san (1997)
Kokkuri-san: Gekijoban (2011)
Kokkuri-san: Shin Toshi Densetsu (2014)
Koko and the Ghosts (2011)
Koko: A Talking Gorilla (1978)
Koko-di Koko-da (2019)
Kokoda (2006)
Kokoda Crescent (1988)
Kokoro ga Sakebitagatterun Da (2015)
Kokowääh (2011)
Kokowääh 2 (2013)
Kokurikozaka kara (From Up on Poppy Hill) (2011)
Kokusai himitsu keisatsu: Kagi no kagi (1965)

Kol–Kom 

Kola Kolaya Mundhirika (2010)
Kolaigaran (2019)
Kolaiyuthir Kaalam (2019)
Kolakkomaban (1983)
Kolamavu Kokila (2018)
Kolamba Sanniya (1976)
Kolamba Sanniya Returns (2018)
Kolangal: (1981 & 1995)
Kolberg (1945)
Kolka Cool (2011)
Kolkatay Kohinoor (2019)
Kollaikaran (2012)
Kollura Sri Mookambika (1993)
Kolpaçino (2009)
Kolpaçino: Bomba (2011)
Kolumittayi (2016)
Kolumpo (2013)
Kolya (1996)
Koma (2004)
Komaali Kings (2018)
Komal Gandhar (1961)
Komaligal (1976)
Komaram (1982)
Komaram Bheem (2010)
Komatha En Kulamatha (1973)
Komban (2015)
The Komediant (2000)
Komedianti (1954)
Komm, süßer Tod (2000)
Kommando 1944 (2018)
Komodo (2000)
Komodo vs. Cobra (2005)
Komola Rocket (2018)
Komori Seikatsu Kojo Club (2008)
Kompull Boros Mok 2 (1972)
Komsomolsk (1938)

Kon–Kop 

The Kon Ichikawa Story (2006)
Kon Khon (2011)
Kon-Tiki: (1950 & 2012)
Kona Coast (1968)
Koncert: (1954 & 1982)
Konchem Ishtam Konchem Kashtam (2009)
Konchem Koththaga (2008)
Konda (2022)
Kondapalli Raja (1993)
Kondattam (1998)
Kondaveeti Raja (1986)
Kondaveeti Simham (1981)
Konec básníků v Čechách (1993)
Konec cesty (1960)
Konec jasnovidce (1957)
Konec milování (1913)
Koneline: Our Land Beautiful (2016)
Kong: Skull Island (2017)
Konga (1961)
Konga Yo (1962)
Kongo (1932)
Kongsi (2011)
Kongunattu Thangam (1961)
Konji Pesalaam (2003)
Konjiki no Gash Bell!! Movie 2: Attack of the Mecha-Vulcan (2005)
Konjum Kumari (1963)
Konjum Salangai (1962)
Konthayum Poonoolum (2014)
Kontinuasom (2009)
Kontroll (2003)
Kony (1986)
Kony 2012 (2012)
Koodal Nagar (2007)
Koodanayum Kattu (1986)
Koodi Balona (1975)
Koodi Vazhnthal Kodi Nanmai: (1959 & 2000)
Koodikazhcha (1991)
Koodum Thedi (1985)
Kooduthedunna Parava (1984)
The Kook (2011)
Kook's Tour (1970)
Koondukkili (1954)
Koormavatara (2011)
Kootathil Oruthan (2017)
Koothara (2014)
Koottinilamkili (1984)
Koottu (2004)
Koottukar: (1966 & 2010)
Koottukudumbam (1969)
Koottu Puzhukkal (1987)
The Kopanoi (1987)
Koper (2006)
Kopps (2003)

Kor–Koz 

Kora Badan (1974)
Kora Kagaz (1974)
Kora Terry (1940)
Koratty Pattanam Railway Gate (2011)
Korczak (1990)
Korea: (1952 & 1995)
Korea: Battleground for Liberty (1959)
The Korean Connection (1974)
A Korean in Paris (2015)
The Korean Wedding Chest (2009)
Koritharicha Naal (1982)
Kosh ba kosh (1993)
Kosher Kitty Kelly (1926)
Koshish (1972)
Kostas (1979)
Kotch (1971)
Kote (2011)
Koteeswarudu (1984)
Kotha Bangaru Lokam (2008)
Kotha Janta (2014)
Kotha Jeevithalu (1980)
Kotha Pelli Koothuru (1985)
Kotigobba (2001)
Kotigobba 2 (2016)
Kotlovina (2011)
Koto (1980)
Kotodama – Spiritual Curse (2014)
Kotoko (2011)
Kotovsky (1942)
Kotreshi Kanasu (1994)
Kotta Alludu (1979)
Kottapeta Rowdy (1980)
Kottappurathe Koottukudumbam (1997)
Kottaaram Vilkkaanundu (1975)
Kottai Mariamman (2001)
Kottai Vaasal (1992)
Kottaram Veettile Apputtan (1998)
Kottum Kuravayum (1987)
Kotwal Saab (1977)
Koumara Swapnangal (1991)
Koundi et le jeudi national (2010)
Kounterfeit (1996)
Kouthuka Varthakal (1990)
The Kovak Box (2006)
Kovil (2004)
Koyaanisqatsi (1982)
Koyelaanchal (2014)
Koyil Kaalai (1993)
Koyil Puraa (1981)
Koyla (1997)
Kozhi Koovuthu: (1982 & 2012)
Kozure Ōkami: Sono Chiisaki Te ni (1993)

Kr

Kra–Kre 

Krabat (2008)
Krabat – The Sorcerer's Apprentice (1978)
Krack (2021)
Krakatoa (1933)
Krakatoa, East of Java (1969)
Krakel Spektakel (2014)
Kraken: Tentacles of the Deep (2006)
Krakonoš a lyžníci (1981)
Kraljeva završnica (1987)
Kramer vs. Kramer (1979)
Krampus (2015)
Krampus: The Devil Returns (2016)
Krampus: The Reckoning (2015)
Krampus Unleashed (2016)
Kranthiveera Sangolli Rayanna (1967)
Kranthiyogi Basavanna (1983)
Kranti: (1981, 2002 & 2006)
Kranti Veera (1972)
Krantidhara (2016)
Krantikaal (2005)
Krantiveer (1994)
Krates (1913)
Kraven the Hunter (2023)
The Krays (1990)
Krazy Kat & Ignatz Mouse Discuss the Letter 'G' (1916)
Krazy Kat and Ignatz Mouse: A Duet, He Made Me Love Him (1916)
Krazy Spooks (1933)
Krazy's Race of Time (1937)
Krazy's Waterloo (1934)
Krazzy 4 (2008)
Krechinsky's Wedding (1953)
Krek (1968)
The Kremlin Letter (1970)
Kremmen: The Movie (1980)
The Kreutzer Sonata: (1911, 1915, 1920, 1922, 1927, 1937, 1987 & 2008)

Kri–Kry 

Kri (2018)
Kri-Kri, the Duchess of Tarabac (1920)
Krieg der Lügen (2014)
Kriemhild's Revenge (1924)
Kriminal (1966)
Kriminaltango (1960)
Kring... Kring... (2015)
Krippendorf's Tribe (1998)
Krisha (2015)
Krishna: (1996 Hindi, 1996 Tamil, 2006, 2007 & 2008)
Krishna Arjun (1997)
Krishna Aur Kans (2012)
Krishna Babu (1999)
Krishna Bakthi (1949)
Krishna Bhakta Bodana (1944)
Krishna Cottage (2004)
Krishna Gaadi Veera Prema Gaadha (2016)
Krishna Gopalakrishna (2002)
Krishna Krishna (2001)
Krishna-Krishna (1986)
Krishna Leela: (1946 & 2015)
Krishna Nee Begane Baro (1986)
Krishna Nee Kunidaga (1989)
Krishna Nee Late Aagi Baaro (2010)
Krishna Pakshakkilikal (2002)
Krishna-Rukku (2016)
Krishna Sudhaama (1943)
Krishna Tere Desh Main (2000)
Krishna Vijayam (1950)
Krishnagudiyil Oru Pranayakalathu (1997)
Krishnam Vande Jagadgurum (2012)
Krishnamma Kalipindi Iddarini (2015)
Krishnan Love Story (2010)
Krishnan Marriage Story (2011)
Krishnan Thoothu (1940)
Krishnan Vandhaan (1987)
Kroadh (1990)
Krodh (2000)
Krodham (1982)
Krodham 2 (2000)
Krodhi (1981)
Krok do tmy (1937)
Kroll (1991)
Kronk's New Groove (2005)
Kronos (1957)
Krrish series:
Koi... Mil Gaya (2003)
Krrish (2006)
Krrish 3 (2013)
Krudt og klunker (1958)
Krull (1983)
Krung Diew Kor Kern Por (1988)
Krush Groove (1985)
Kruté radosti (2002)
Krvavý román (1993)
Krybskytterne på Næsbygård (1966)
Krystal (2017)

Ks 

Kshamichu Ennoru Vakku (1986)
Kshana Kshana (2007)
Kshanakkathu (1990)
Kshanam (2016)
Kshanbhar Vishranti (2010)
Kshatriya (1993)
Kshema Bhoomi (2010)
Kshemamga Velli Labhamga Randi (2000)
Kshetram (2011)
Kshudhita Pashan (1960)

Ku 

Ku! Kin-dza-dza (2013)
Ku-Fu? Dalla Sicilia con furore (1973)

Kua–Kud 

Kuarup (1989)
Kubala (1955)
Kubera Kuchela (1943)
Kubera Theevu (1963)
Kuberan: (2000 & 2002)
Kubi Matthu Iyala (1992)
Kubinke the Barber (1926)
Kubo and the Two Strings (2016)
Kubot: The Aswang Chronicles 2 (2014)
Kucch Luv Jaisaa (2011)
Kucch To Hai (2003)
Kuch Khatti Kuch Meethi (2001)
Kuch Kuch Hota Hai (1998)
Kuch Kuch Locha Hai (2015)
Kuch Naa Kaho (2003)
Kuch Tum Kaho Kuch Hum Kahein (2002)
Kuchh Bheege Alfaaz (2018)
Kuchh Meetha Ho Jaye (2005)
Kuchhe Dhaage (1973)
Kuchibiru ni uta o (2015)
Kudaikul Mazhai (2004)
Kudamattam (1997)
Kudesan (2012)
Kudiattam (1986)
Kudirithe Kappu Coffee (2011)
Kudiyarasu (2009)
Kudiyirundha Koyil (1968)
Kudiyon Ka Hai Zamana (2006)
Kudrat: (1981 & 1998)
Kudumba Gouravam (1958)
Kudumba Sangili (1999)
Kudumba Thalaivan (1962)
Kudumba Vaarthakal (1998)
Kudumba Vilakku (1956)
Kudumba Vishesham (1994)
Kudumbam: (1954, 1967 & 1984)
Kudumbam Namukku Sreekovil (1978)
Kudumbam Oru Kadambam (1981)
Kudumbam Oru Koyil (1987)
Kudumbapuranam (1988)
Kudumbasree Travels (2011)
Kudumbini (1964)
Kuduz (1989)

Kue–Kum 

Kuei-Mei, a Woman (1985)
Kueki Ressha (2012)
Kuffs (1992)
Kuhak (1960)
Kuheli (1971)
Kuhio taisa (2009)
Kuhle Wampe (1932)
Kuhveriakee Kaakuhey? (2011)
Kuiba (2011)
Kuiba 2 (2013)
Kuiba 3 (2014)
Kukka Katuku Cheppu Debba (1979)
Kuku 3D (2013)
Kuku Mathur Ki Jhand Ho Gayi (2014)
Kukurantumi, the road to Accra (1983)
Kula Dheivam (1956)
Kula Gotralu (1962)
Kula Gourava (1971)
Kula Gowravam (1972)
Kulam (1997)
Kulama Gunama (1971)
Kulamagal Radhai (1963)
Kulambadikal (1986)
Kulavadhu (1963)
Kule kidz gråter ikke (2014)
Kulimlim (2004)
Kulir 100° (2009)
Kulirkaala Megangal (1986)
Kull the Conqueror (1997)
Kulla Agent 000 (1972)
Kulla Kulli (1980)
Kullanari Koottam (2011)
Kultur (1918)
Kulvadhu (1937)
Kuma (2012)
Kuma Ching (1969)
Kumara Raja (1961)
Kumara Sambhavam (1969)
Kumaré (2011)
Kumari: (1952 & 1977)
Kumari 21F (2015)
Kumari Kottam (1971)
Kumari Penn (1966)
Kumari Pennin Ullathile (1980)
Kumbakarai Thangaiah (1991)
Kumbakonam Gopalu (1998)
Kumbalangi Nights (2019)
Kumbasaram (2015)
Kumiko, the Treasure Hunter (2014)
Kumir (1988)
Kumki (2012)
Kumkum the Dancer (1940)
Kumkuma Rakshe (1977)
Kumkumacheppu (1996)
Kummatty (1979)
Kummeli: Kultakuume (1997)
Kummelin Jackpot (2006)
Kummi Paattu (1999)
Kumo to Tulip (1943)
Kumpanía: Flamenco Los Angeles (2011)
Kumu Hina (2014)
Kumudham (1961)

Kun 

Kun en Tigger (1912)
Kundan (1955)
Kundo: Age of the Rampant (2014)
Kundun (1997)
Kung Aagawin Mo Ang Lahat Sa Akin (1987)
Kung Ayaw Mo, Huwag Mo! (1998)
Kung Fu Angels (2014)
Kung Fu Chefs (2009)
Kung Fu Cult Master (1993)
Kung Fu Divas (2013)
Kung Fu Dunk (2008)
Kung Fu Elliot (2014)
Kung Fu Finger Book (1979)
Kung Fu Hustle (2004)
The Kung Fu Instructor (1979)
Kung Fu Jungle (2014)
Kung Fu Kid (1994)
Kung Fu Killers (1974)
Kung Fu Mahjong (2005)
Kung Fu Mahjong 2 (2005)
Kung Fu Mama (2011)
Kung Fu Man (2012)
Kung Fu Master (1988)
Kung Fu Monster (2018)
Kung Fu Panda series:
Kung Fu Panda (2008)
Kung Fu Panda 2 (2011)
Kung Fu Panda 3 (2016)
Kung Fu Pocong Perawan (2012)
The Kung Fu Scholar (1993)
Kung Fu Style (2015)
Kung Fu Tootsie (2007)
Kung Fu Vs. Yoga (1979)
Kung Fu VS Acrobatic (1990)
Kung Fu Yoga (2017)
Kung Fu Zombie (1981)
Kung Fu: The Movie (1986)
Kung Fury (2015)
Kung Fury 2 (2022)
Kung-Fu Magoo (2010)
Kung Hei Fat Choy (1985)
Kung Ikaw Ay Isang Panaginip (2002)
Kung Mangarap Ka't Magising (1977)
Kung Phooey (2003)
Kung Pow: Enter the Fist (2002)
Kungajakt (1944)
Kungfu Cyborg (2009)
Kungliga patrasket (1945)
Kunguma Chimil (1985)
Kunguma Kodu (1988)
Kunguma Poovum Konjum Puravum (2009)
Kunguma Pottu Gounder (2001)
Kungumam (1963)
Kuni Mulgi Deta Ka Mulgi (2012)
Kunisada Chūji: (1954 & 1958)
The Kunoichi: Ninja Girl (2011)

Kup–Kur 

Kuppathu Raja: (1979 & 2019)
Kuppivala (1965)
Kura (1995)
Kurama Tengu (1928)
Kurama Tengu: Kyōfu Jidai (1928)
Kurama Tengu ōedo ihen (1950)
Kurangu Bommai (2017)
Kurbaan: (1991 & 2009)
Kurfürstendamm (1920)
Kurigalu Saar Kurigalu (2001)
The Kurnell Story (1957)
Kuro Arirang (1989)
Kuroko's Basketball The Movie: Last Game (2017)
Kuroneko (1968)
Kurosagi (2006)
Kurosawa's Way (2011)
Kurt Cobain: About a Son (2006)
Kurt Cobain: Montage of Heck (2015)
Kurt & Courtney (1998)
Kurtlar Vadisi Irak (2006)
Kurtuluş: The Steamship That Carried Peace (2006)
Kurukkan Rajavayi (1987)
Kurukkante Kalyanam (1982)
Kurukshethram (1970)
Kurukshetra: (1945, 2000, 2002, 2008 & 2019)
Kurukshetram: (1977 & 2006)
Kurulu Bedda (1961)
Kurulu Pihatu (2006)
Kuruthi Aattam (2022)
Kuruthipunal (1995)
Kuruthykkalam (1969)

Kus–Kuz 

Kusa Pabha (2012)
Kusal (2018)
Kusama: Infinity (2018)
Kush (2007)
Kushi: (2000, 2001 & 2022)
Kushi Kushiga (2004)
Kushti (2010)
Kusruthi Kuruppu (1998)
Kusruthikaatu (1995)
Kusruthykuttan (1966)
Kustom Kar Kommandos (1965)
Kusum Kusum Prem (2011)
Kusume Rumal (1985)
Kusume Rumal 2 (2009)
Kuthoosi (2019)
Kuththu (2004)
Kutravaaligal (1985)
Kutsal Damacana (2007)
Kutsal Damacana: Dracoola (2011)
Kutsal Damacana 2: İtmen (2010)
Kutsu-Juku seiklusi (1931)
Kuttettan (1990)
Kutti Puli (2013)
Kuttikalundu Sookshikkuka (2016)
Kuttikkuppayam (1964)
Kuttram Purindhaal (2018)
Kuttram Seiyel (2019)
Kuttrame Thandanai (2016)
Kuttrapathirikai (2007)
Kuttravali (1989)
Kutty: (2001 & 2010)
Kutumba Gowravam (1957)
Kutuzov (1943)
Kuva Kuva Vaathugal (1984)
Kuveni 2: Yakshadeshaya (TBD)
Kuxa Kanema: The Birth of Cinema (2003)
Kuyiline Thedi (1983)
Kuzhandaiyum Deivamum (1965)
Kuzhandhaigal Kanda Kudiyarasu (1960)
Kuzhanthaikkaga (1968)

Kv–Ky 

Kvadrat (2013)
Kwai Boo (2015)
Kwaidan (1965)
Kwaku Ananse (2013)
The Kwannon of Okadera (1920)
Kwiecień (1961)
Kya Dilli Kya Lahore (2014)
Kya Kehna (2000)
Kya Love Story Hai (2007)
Kya Yahi Sach Hai (2011)
Kya Yehi Pyaar Hai (2002)
Kyaa Dil Ne Kahaa (2002)
Kyaa Kool Hai Hum (2005)
Kyaa Kool Hain Hum 3 (2016)
Kyaa Super Kool Hain Hum (2012)
Kyan Sit Min (2005)
Kyō Kara Hitman (2009)
Kyo Kii... Main Jhuth Nahin Bolta (2001)
Kyon? Kis Liye? (2003)
Kyon Ki (2005)
Kyoufu Densetsu Kaiki! Frankenstein (1981 TV)
Kyu-chan no Dekkai Yume (1967)
Kyuketsu Onsen e Yokoso (1997)
Kyun...! Ho Gaya Na (2004)
Kyun Tum Say Itna Pyar Hai (2005)

Previous:  List of films: I    Next:  List of films: L

See also 

 Lists of films
 Lists of actors
 List of film and television directors
 List of documentary films
 List of film production companies

-